

276001–276100 

|-bgcolor=#fefefe
| 276001 ||  || — || December 15, 2001 || Socorro || LINEAR || NYSfast? || align=right data-sort-value="0.92" | 920 m || 
|-id=002 bgcolor=#E9E9E9
| 276002 ||  || — || December 15, 2001 || Socorro || LINEAR || — || align=right | 1.7 km || 
|-id=003 bgcolor=#E9E9E9
| 276003 ||  || — || December 17, 2001 || Socorro || LINEAR || BRG || align=right | 1.9 km || 
|-id=004 bgcolor=#E9E9E9
| 276004 ||  || — || December 17, 2001 || Socorro || LINEAR || — || align=right | 1.6 km || 
|-id=005 bgcolor=#E9E9E9
| 276005 ||  || — || December 17, 2001 || Socorro || LINEAR || — || align=right | 5.3 km || 
|-id=006 bgcolor=#E9E9E9
| 276006 ||  || — || December 18, 2001 || Socorro || LINEAR || — || align=right | 1.2 km || 
|-id=007 bgcolor=#E9E9E9
| 276007 ||  || — || December 18, 2001 || Socorro || LINEAR || — || align=right | 2.8 km || 
|-id=008 bgcolor=#E9E9E9
| 276008 ||  || — || December 18, 2001 || Socorro || LINEAR || — || align=right | 1.4 km || 
|-id=009 bgcolor=#E9E9E9
| 276009 ||  || — || December 18, 2001 || Socorro || LINEAR || — || align=right | 2.4 km || 
|-id=010 bgcolor=#E9E9E9
| 276010 ||  || — || December 18, 2001 || Socorro || LINEAR || — || align=right | 2.0 km || 
|-id=011 bgcolor=#E9E9E9
| 276011 ||  || — || December 18, 2001 || Socorro || LINEAR || — || align=right | 1.3 km || 
|-id=012 bgcolor=#E9E9E9
| 276012 ||  || — || December 18, 2001 || Socorro || LINEAR || — || align=right | 1.3 km || 
|-id=013 bgcolor=#E9E9E9
| 276013 ||  || — || December 17, 2001 || Palomar || NEAT || — || align=right | 1.9 km || 
|-id=014 bgcolor=#E9E9E9
| 276014 ||  || — || December 17, 2001 || Socorro || LINEAR || — || align=right | 1.8 km || 
|-id=015 bgcolor=#fefefe
| 276015 ||  || — || December 20, 2001 || Kitt Peak || Spacewatch || ERI || align=right | 1.5 km || 
|-id=016 bgcolor=#E9E9E9
| 276016 ||  || — || December 17, 2001 || Socorro || LINEAR || — || align=right | 1.9 km || 
|-id=017 bgcolor=#E9E9E9
| 276017 ||  || — || December 17, 2001 || Socorro || LINEAR || — || align=right | 1.3 km || 
|-id=018 bgcolor=#E9E9E9
| 276018 ||  || — || January 9, 2002 || Cima Ekar || ADAS || RAF || align=right | 1.3 km || 
|-id=019 bgcolor=#E9E9E9
| 276019 ||  || — || January 11, 2002 || Campo Imperatore || CINEOS || EUN || align=right | 2.0 km || 
|-id=020 bgcolor=#E9E9E9
| 276020 ||  || — || January 12, 2002 || Desert Eagle || W. K. Y. Yeung || — || align=right | 1.7 km || 
|-id=021 bgcolor=#E9E9E9
| 276021 ||  || — || January 5, 2002 || Haleakala || NEAT || — || align=right | 1.4 km || 
|-id=022 bgcolor=#E9E9E9
| 276022 ||  || — || January 7, 2002 || Anderson Mesa || LONEOS || — || align=right | 1.8 km || 
|-id=023 bgcolor=#E9E9E9
| 276023 ||  || — || January 9, 2002 || Socorro || LINEAR || — || align=right | 1.00 km || 
|-id=024 bgcolor=#fefefe
| 276024 ||  || — || January 9, 2002 || Socorro || LINEAR || — || align=right | 1.0 km || 
|-id=025 bgcolor=#E9E9E9
| 276025 ||  || — || January 9, 2002 || Socorro || LINEAR || — || align=right | 2.3 km || 
|-id=026 bgcolor=#E9E9E9
| 276026 ||  || — || January 11, 2002 || Socorro || LINEAR || RAF || align=right | 1.7 km || 
|-id=027 bgcolor=#E9E9E9
| 276027 ||  || — || January 9, 2002 || Campo Imperatore || CINEOS || — || align=right | 1.4 km || 
|-id=028 bgcolor=#E9E9E9
| 276028 ||  || — || January 8, 2002 || Socorro || LINEAR || — || align=right | 1.3 km || 
|-id=029 bgcolor=#E9E9E9
| 276029 ||  || — || January 8, 2002 || Socorro || LINEAR || — || align=right | 2.3 km || 
|-id=030 bgcolor=#E9E9E9
| 276030 ||  || — || January 8, 2002 || Socorro || LINEAR || — || align=right | 1.2 km || 
|-id=031 bgcolor=#E9E9E9
| 276031 ||  || — || January 9, 2002 || Socorro || LINEAR || — || align=right | 1.2 km || 
|-id=032 bgcolor=#E9E9E9
| 276032 ||  || — || January 9, 2002 || Socorro || LINEAR || — || align=right | 1.6 km || 
|-id=033 bgcolor=#FFC2E0
| 276033 ||  || — || January 15, 2002 || Haleakala || NEAT || APOPHA || align=right data-sort-value="0.65" | 650 m || 
|-id=034 bgcolor=#E9E9E9
| 276034 ||  || — || January 15, 2002 || Kingsnake || J. V. McClusky || — || align=right | 2.2 km || 
|-id=035 bgcolor=#E9E9E9
| 276035 ||  || — || January 13, 2002 || Socorro || LINEAR || HNS || align=right | 1.7 km || 
|-id=036 bgcolor=#fefefe
| 276036 ||  || — || January 13, 2002 || Socorro || LINEAR || — || align=right | 1.4 km || 
|-id=037 bgcolor=#E9E9E9
| 276037 ||  || — || January 14, 2002 || Socorro || LINEAR || — || align=right | 1.2 km || 
|-id=038 bgcolor=#E9E9E9
| 276038 ||  || — || January 14, 2002 || Socorro || LINEAR || — || align=right | 1.8 km || 
|-id=039 bgcolor=#E9E9E9
| 276039 ||  || — || January 14, 2002 || Socorro || LINEAR || EUN || align=right | 1.7 km || 
|-id=040 bgcolor=#E9E9E9
| 276040 ||  || — || January 13, 2002 || Socorro || LINEAR || — || align=right | 1.4 km || 
|-id=041 bgcolor=#E9E9E9
| 276041 ||  || — || January 13, 2002 || Socorro || LINEAR || — || align=right | 1.8 km || 
|-id=042 bgcolor=#E9E9E9
| 276042 ||  || — || January 14, 2002 || Socorro || LINEAR || — || align=right | 1.1 km || 
|-id=043 bgcolor=#E9E9E9
| 276043 ||  || — || January 5, 2002 || Kitt Peak || Spacewatch || — || align=right | 2.7 km || 
|-id=044 bgcolor=#E9E9E9
| 276044 ||  || — || January 19, 2002 || Anderson Mesa || LONEOS || — || align=right | 1.4 km || 
|-id=045 bgcolor=#E9E9E9
| 276045 ||  || — || January 23, 2002 || Socorro || LINEAR || — || align=right | 2.7 km || 
|-id=046 bgcolor=#E9E9E9
| 276046 ||  || — || January 19, 2002 || Anderson Mesa || LONEOS || MIT || align=right | 4.8 km || 
|-id=047 bgcolor=#E9E9E9
| 276047 ||  || — || February 4, 2002 || Haleakala || NEAT || — || align=right | 1.4 km || 
|-id=048 bgcolor=#E9E9E9
| 276048 ||  || — || February 6, 2002 || Desert Eagle || W. K. Y. Yeung || — || align=right | 2.1 km || 
|-id=049 bgcolor=#FFC2E0
| 276049 ||  || — || February 10, 2002 || Socorro || LINEAR || APO +1kmmoon || align=right | 3.5 km || 
|-id=050 bgcolor=#E9E9E9
| 276050 ||  || — || February 6, 2002 || Socorro || LINEAR || — || align=right | 1.2 km || 
|-id=051 bgcolor=#E9E9E9
| 276051 ||  || — || February 6, 2002 || Socorro || LINEAR || — || align=right | 1.6 km || 
|-id=052 bgcolor=#E9E9E9
| 276052 ||  || — || February 6, 2002 || Socorro || LINEAR || — || align=right | 1.5 km || 
|-id=053 bgcolor=#E9E9E9
| 276053 ||  || — || February 6, 2002 || Socorro || LINEAR || RAF || align=right | 1.4 km || 
|-id=054 bgcolor=#E9E9E9
| 276054 ||  || — || February 6, 2002 || Socorro || LINEAR || — || align=right | 2.6 km || 
|-id=055 bgcolor=#E9E9E9
| 276055 ||  || — || February 7, 2002 || Socorro || LINEAR || — || align=right | 3.1 km || 
|-id=056 bgcolor=#E9E9E9
| 276056 ||  || — || February 3, 2002 || Haleakala || NEAT || — || align=right | 1.2 km || 
|-id=057 bgcolor=#E9E9E9
| 276057 ||  || — || February 6, 2002 || Socorro || LINEAR || — || align=right | 3.1 km || 
|-id=058 bgcolor=#E9E9E9
| 276058 ||  || — || February 7, 2002 || Socorro || LINEAR || — || align=right | 1.5 km || 
|-id=059 bgcolor=#E9E9E9
| 276059 ||  || — || February 7, 2002 || Socorro || LINEAR || — || align=right | 1.4 km || 
|-id=060 bgcolor=#E9E9E9
| 276060 ||  || — || February 7, 2002 || Socorro || LINEAR || RAF || align=right | 1.2 km || 
|-id=061 bgcolor=#E9E9E9
| 276061 ||  || — || February 7, 2002 || Socorro || LINEAR || DOR || align=right | 3.6 km || 
|-id=062 bgcolor=#E9E9E9
| 276062 ||  || — || February 8, 2002 || Socorro || LINEAR || — || align=right | 2.5 km || 
|-id=063 bgcolor=#E9E9E9
| 276063 ||  || — || February 7, 2002 || Socorro || LINEAR || — || align=right | 1.0 km || 
|-id=064 bgcolor=#d6d6d6
| 276064 ||  || — || February 7, 2002 || Socorro || LINEAR || — || align=right | 4.2 km || 
|-id=065 bgcolor=#E9E9E9
| 276065 ||  || — || February 7, 2002 || Socorro || LINEAR || — || align=right | 1.5 km || 
|-id=066 bgcolor=#E9E9E9
| 276066 ||  || — || February 8, 2002 || Socorro || LINEAR || — || align=right | 2.0 km || 
|-id=067 bgcolor=#E9E9E9
| 276067 ||  || — || February 9, 2002 || Socorro || LINEAR || — || align=right | 3.0 km || 
|-id=068 bgcolor=#E9E9E9
| 276068 ||  || — || February 8, 2002 || Socorro || LINEAR || ADE || align=right | 3.0 km || 
|-id=069 bgcolor=#E9E9E9
| 276069 ||  || — || February 8, 2002 || Socorro || LINEAR || — || align=right | 2.2 km || 
|-id=070 bgcolor=#E9E9E9
| 276070 ||  || — || February 10, 2002 || Socorro || LINEAR || WIT || align=right | 1.6 km || 
|-id=071 bgcolor=#E9E9E9
| 276071 ||  || — || February 10, 2002 || Socorro || LINEAR || — || align=right | 2.2 km || 
|-id=072 bgcolor=#E9E9E9
| 276072 ||  || — || February 10, 2002 || Socorro || LINEAR || — || align=right | 2.4 km || 
|-id=073 bgcolor=#E9E9E9
| 276073 ||  || — || February 10, 2002 || Socorro || LINEAR || — || align=right | 1.7 km || 
|-id=074 bgcolor=#E9E9E9
| 276074 ||  || — || February 10, 2002 || Socorro || LINEAR || — || align=right | 1.9 km || 
|-id=075 bgcolor=#E9E9E9
| 276075 ||  || — || February 10, 2002 || Socorro || LINEAR || — || align=right | 3.1 km || 
|-id=076 bgcolor=#E9E9E9
| 276076 ||  || — || February 10, 2002 || Socorro || LINEAR || HEN || align=right | 1.6 km || 
|-id=077 bgcolor=#E9E9E9
| 276077 ||  || — || February 10, 2002 || Socorro || LINEAR || — || align=right | 2.0 km || 
|-id=078 bgcolor=#E9E9E9
| 276078 ||  || — || February 11, 2002 || Socorro || LINEAR || — || align=right | 1.6 km || 
|-id=079 bgcolor=#E9E9E9
| 276079 ||  || — || February 7, 2002 || Kitt Peak || M. W. Buie || — || align=right | 1.4 km || 
|-id=080 bgcolor=#E9E9E9
| 276080 ||  || — || February 7, 2002 || Kitt Peak || Spacewatch || — || align=right | 1.7 km || 
|-id=081 bgcolor=#d6d6d6
| 276081 ||  || — || February 7, 2002 || Kitt Peak || Spacewatch || — || align=right | 3.6 km || 
|-id=082 bgcolor=#E9E9E9
| 276082 ||  || — || February 8, 2002 || Kitt Peak || Spacewatch || — || align=right | 1.4 km || 
|-id=083 bgcolor=#E9E9E9
| 276083 ||  || — || February 10, 2002 || Socorro || LINEAR || — || align=right | 1.7 km || 
|-id=084 bgcolor=#E9E9E9
| 276084 ||  || — || February 10, 2002 || Socorro || LINEAR || MAR || align=right | 1.8 km || 
|-id=085 bgcolor=#E9E9E9
| 276085 ||  || — || February 10, 2002 || Socorro || LINEAR || — || align=right | 2.0 km || 
|-id=086 bgcolor=#E9E9E9
| 276086 ||  || — || February 12, 2002 || Socorro || LINEAR || — || align=right | 1.9 km || 
|-id=087 bgcolor=#E9E9E9
| 276087 ||  || — || February 10, 2002 || Socorro || LINEAR || MIS || align=right | 1.9 km || 
|-id=088 bgcolor=#E9E9E9
| 276088 ||  || — || February 19, 2002 || Socorro || LINEAR || — || align=right | 1.6 km || 
|-id=089 bgcolor=#E9E9E9
| 276089 ||  || — || February 20, 2002 || Socorro || LINEAR || — || align=right | 3.1 km || 
|-id=090 bgcolor=#E9E9E9
| 276090 ||  || — || February 16, 2002 || Palomar || NEAT || — || align=right | 1.6 km || 
|-id=091 bgcolor=#E9E9E9
| 276091 ||  || — || February 22, 2002 || Palomar || NEAT || — || align=right | 2.7 km || 
|-id=092 bgcolor=#E9E9E9
| 276092 ||  || — || February 19, 2002 || Socorro || LINEAR || ADE || align=right | 3.2 km || 
|-id=093 bgcolor=#E9E9E9
| 276093 ||  || — || March 3, 2002 || Socorro || LINEAR || BAR || align=right | 2.7 km || 
|-id=094 bgcolor=#E9E9E9
| 276094 ||  || — || March 13, 2002 || Palomar || NEAT || JUL || align=right | 1.7 km || 
|-id=095 bgcolor=#E9E9E9
| 276095 ||  || — || March 13, 2002 || Palomar || NEAT || — || align=right | 2.4 km || 
|-id=096 bgcolor=#d6d6d6
| 276096 ||  || — || March 9, 2002 || Palomar || NEAT || — || align=right | 3.5 km || 
|-id=097 bgcolor=#E9E9E9
| 276097 ||  || — || March 12, 2002 || Palomar || NEAT || MIS || align=right | 2.9 km || 
|-id=098 bgcolor=#E9E9E9
| 276098 ||  || — || March 13, 2002 || Socorro || LINEAR || — || align=right | 1.8 km || 
|-id=099 bgcolor=#E9E9E9
| 276099 ||  || — || March 13, 2002 || Socorro || LINEAR || — || align=right | 1.9 km || 
|-id=100 bgcolor=#E9E9E9
| 276100 ||  || — || March 13, 2002 || Socorro || LINEAR || — || align=right | 3.1 km || 
|}

276101–276200 

|-bgcolor=#E9E9E9
| 276101 ||  || — || March 5, 2002 || Palomar || NEAT || — || align=right | 2.7 km || 
|-id=102 bgcolor=#E9E9E9
| 276102 ||  || — || March 9, 2002 || Anderson Mesa || LONEOS || — || align=right | 1.6 km || 
|-id=103 bgcolor=#E9E9E9
| 276103 ||  || — || March 13, 2002 || Socorro || LINEAR || — || align=right | 2.1 km || 
|-id=104 bgcolor=#E9E9E9
| 276104 ||  || — || March 15, 2002 || Palomar || NEAT || — || align=right | 2.6 km || 
|-id=105 bgcolor=#E9E9E9
| 276105 ||  || — || March 13, 2002 || Palomar || NEAT || — || align=right | 1.4 km || 
|-id=106 bgcolor=#E9E9E9
| 276106 ||  || — || March 19, 2002 || Palomar || NEAT || — || align=right | 2.8 km || 
|-id=107 bgcolor=#E9E9E9
| 276107 ||  || — || March 20, 2002 || Socorro || LINEAR || — || align=right | 1.9 km || 
|-id=108 bgcolor=#E9E9E9
| 276108 ||  || — || March 21, 2002 || Anderson Mesa || LONEOS || EUN || align=right | 1.7 km || 
|-id=109 bgcolor=#FA8072
| 276109 ||  || — || April 10, 2002 || Socorro || LINEAR || — || align=right | 1.6 km || 
|-id=110 bgcolor=#fefefe
| 276110 ||  || — || April 9, 2002 || Socorro || LINEAR || H || align=right | 1.2 km || 
|-id=111 bgcolor=#FFC2E0
| 276111 ||  || — || April 12, 2002 || Palomar || NEAT || AMO || align=right data-sort-value="0.69" | 690 m || 
|-id=112 bgcolor=#E9E9E9
| 276112 ||  || — || April 8, 2002 || Bergisch Gladbach || W. Bickel || — || align=right | 2.4 km || 
|-id=113 bgcolor=#E9E9E9
| 276113 ||  || — || April 2, 2002 || Palomar || NEAT || — || align=right | 1.6 km || 
|-id=114 bgcolor=#E9E9E9
| 276114 ||  || — || March 20, 2002 || Kitt Peak || Spacewatch || WIT || align=right | 1.4 km || 
|-id=115 bgcolor=#E9E9E9
| 276115 ||  || — || April 5, 2002 || Palomar || NEAT || EUN || align=right | 1.8 km || 
|-id=116 bgcolor=#E9E9E9
| 276116 ||  || — || April 8, 2002 || Palomar || NEAT || — || align=right | 2.7 km || 
|-id=117 bgcolor=#E9E9E9
| 276117 ||  || — || April 8, 2002 || Palomar || NEAT || — || align=right | 1.8 km || 
|-id=118 bgcolor=#E9E9E9
| 276118 ||  || — || April 6, 2002 || Kitt Peak || Spacewatch || — || align=right | 1.8 km || 
|-id=119 bgcolor=#E9E9E9
| 276119 ||  || — || April 9, 2002 || Anderson Mesa || LONEOS || — || align=right | 2.3 km || 
|-id=120 bgcolor=#E9E9E9
| 276120 ||  || — || April 10, 2002 || Palomar || NEAT || — || align=right | 4.0 km || 
|-id=121 bgcolor=#E9E9E9
| 276121 ||  || — || April 10, 2002 || Socorro || LINEAR || — || align=right | 1.9 km || 
|-id=122 bgcolor=#fefefe
| 276122 ||  || — || April 10, 2002 || Socorro || LINEAR || — || align=right | 2.0 km || 
|-id=123 bgcolor=#E9E9E9
| 276123 ||  || — || April 10, 2002 || Socorro || LINEAR || — || align=right | 4.1 km || 
|-id=124 bgcolor=#fefefe
| 276124 ||  || — || April 10, 2002 || Socorro || LINEAR || NYS || align=right | 2.4 km || 
|-id=125 bgcolor=#E9E9E9
| 276125 ||  || — || April 10, 2002 || Socorro || LINEAR || — || align=right | 2.2 km || 
|-id=126 bgcolor=#d6d6d6
| 276126 ||  || — || April 10, 2002 || Socorro || LINEAR || — || align=right | 3.2 km || 
|-id=127 bgcolor=#E9E9E9
| 276127 ||  || — || April 10, 2002 || Socorro || LINEAR || ADE || align=right | 3.3 km || 
|-id=128 bgcolor=#E9E9E9
| 276128 ||  || — || April 11, 2002 || Anderson Mesa || LONEOS || — || align=right | 3.6 km || 
|-id=129 bgcolor=#E9E9E9
| 276129 ||  || — || April 12, 2002 || Palomar || NEAT || — || align=right | 3.4 km || 
|-id=130 bgcolor=#fefefe
| 276130 ||  || — || April 12, 2002 || Kitt Peak || Spacewatch || — || align=right | 1.3 km || 
|-id=131 bgcolor=#fefefe
| 276131 ||  || — || April 12, 2002 || Socorro || LINEAR || H || align=right data-sort-value="0.79" | 790 m || 
|-id=132 bgcolor=#E9E9E9
| 276132 ||  || — || April 12, 2002 || Kitt Peak || Spacewatch || — || align=right | 3.2 km || 
|-id=133 bgcolor=#E9E9E9
| 276133 ||  || — || April 14, 2002 || Socorro || LINEAR || — || align=right | 1.9 km || 
|-id=134 bgcolor=#E9E9E9
| 276134 ||  || — || April 12, 2002 || Palomar || NEAT || GEF || align=right | 1.7 km || 
|-id=135 bgcolor=#E9E9E9
| 276135 ||  || — || April 12, 2002 || Palomar || NEAT || — || align=right | 2.5 km || 
|-id=136 bgcolor=#E9E9E9
| 276136 ||  || — || April 13, 2002 || Palomar || NEAT || — || align=right | 2.0 km || 
|-id=137 bgcolor=#E9E9E9
| 276137 ||  || — || April 14, 2002 || Palomar || NEAT || MRX || align=right | 1.4 km || 
|-id=138 bgcolor=#E9E9E9
| 276138 ||  || — || April 8, 2002 || Palomar || NEAT || AST || align=right | 2.1 km || 
|-id=139 bgcolor=#E9E9E9
| 276139 ||  || — || April 18, 2002 || Haleakala || NEAT || — || align=right | 2.1 km || 
|-id=140 bgcolor=#E9E9E9
| 276140 ||  || — || April 21, 2002 || Palomar || NEAT || HNS || align=right | 1.8 km || 
|-id=141 bgcolor=#E9E9E9
| 276141 ||  || — || April 17, 2002 || Socorro || LINEAR || — || align=right | 2.9 km || 
|-id=142 bgcolor=#E9E9E9
| 276142 ||  || — || April 26, 2002 || Haleakala || NEAT || — || align=right | 3.1 km || 
|-id=143 bgcolor=#E9E9E9
| 276143 ||  || — || May 5, 2002 || Palomar || NEAT || — || align=right | 3.4 km || 
|-id=144 bgcolor=#E9E9E9
| 276144 ||  || — || May 7, 2002 || Palomar || NEAT || — || align=right | 3.0 km || 
|-id=145 bgcolor=#E9E9E9
| 276145 ||  || — || May 9, 2002 || Palomar || NEAT || CLO || align=right | 2.3 km || 
|-id=146 bgcolor=#E9E9E9
| 276146 ||  || — || May 9, 2002 || Socorro || LINEAR || — || align=right | 1.9 km || 
|-id=147 bgcolor=#E9E9E9
| 276147 ||  || — || May 9, 2002 || Socorro || LINEAR || — || align=right | 3.6 km || 
|-id=148 bgcolor=#E9E9E9
| 276148 ||  || — || May 11, 2002 || Socorro || LINEAR || — || align=right | 2.6 km || 
|-id=149 bgcolor=#E9E9E9
| 276149 ||  || — || May 13, 2002 || Palomar || NEAT || — || align=right | 3.3 km || 
|-id=150 bgcolor=#E9E9E9
| 276150 ||  || — || May 13, 2002 || Palomar || NEAT || — || align=right | 3.8 km || 
|-id=151 bgcolor=#E9E9E9
| 276151 ||  || — || May 11, 2002 || Socorro || LINEAR || — || align=right | 3.1 km || 
|-id=152 bgcolor=#E9E9E9
| 276152 ||  || — || May 6, 2002 || Palomar || NEAT || — || align=right | 3.2 km || 
|-id=153 bgcolor=#E9E9E9
| 276153 ||  || — || May 10, 2002 || Kitt Peak || Spacewatch || — || align=right | 3.0 km || 
|-id=154 bgcolor=#E9E9E9
| 276154 ||  || — || May 13, 2002 || Palomar || NEAT || — || align=right | 3.5 km || 
|-id=155 bgcolor=#E9E9E9
| 276155 ||  || — || May 17, 2002 || Haleakala || NEAT || — || align=right | 2.0 km || 
|-id=156 bgcolor=#E9E9E9
| 276156 ||  || — || June 2, 2002 || Palomar || NEAT || NEM || align=right | 3.2 km || 
|-id=157 bgcolor=#fefefe
| 276157 ||  || — || June 6, 2002 || Socorro || LINEAR || — || align=right | 1.2 km || 
|-id=158 bgcolor=#E9E9E9
| 276158 ||  || — || June 10, 2002 || Palomar || NEAT || — || align=right | 3.8 km || 
|-id=159 bgcolor=#E9E9E9
| 276159 ||  || — || June 12, 2002 || Socorro || LINEAR || — || align=right | 4.3 km || 
|-id=160 bgcolor=#E9E9E9
| 276160 ||  || — || June 9, 2002 || Socorro || LINEAR || — || align=right | 3.6 km || 
|-id=161 bgcolor=#E9E9E9
| 276161 ||  || — || June 8, 2002 || Socorro || LINEAR || — || align=right | 1.1 km || 
|-id=162 bgcolor=#d6d6d6
| 276162 ||  || — || June 1, 2002 || Palomar || NEAT || EOS || align=right | 2.4 km || 
|-id=163 bgcolor=#d6d6d6
| 276163 Tafreshi ||  ||  || June 13, 2002 || Palomar || NEAT || — || align=right | 3.4 km || 
|-id=164 bgcolor=#d6d6d6
| 276164 ||  || — || July 14, 2002 || Palomar || NEAT || — || align=right | 3.2 km || 
|-id=165 bgcolor=#d6d6d6
| 276165 ||  || — || September 26, 2008 || Kitt Peak || Spacewatch || CHA || align=right | 2.7 km || 
|-id=166 bgcolor=#d6d6d6
| 276166 ||  || — || July 17, 2002 || Palomar || NEAT || BRA || align=right | 2.2 km || 
|-id=167 bgcolor=#d6d6d6
| 276167 ||  || — || July 20, 2002 || Palomar || NEAT || TRP || align=right | 4.1 km || 
|-id=168 bgcolor=#fefefe
| 276168 ||  || — || July 21, 2002 || Palomar || NEAT || V || align=right data-sort-value="0.73" | 730 m || 
|-id=169 bgcolor=#d6d6d6
| 276169 ||  || — || July 29, 2002 || Palomar || NEAT || — || align=right | 4.4 km || 
|-id=170 bgcolor=#d6d6d6
| 276170 ||  || — || October 17, 2003 || Kitt Peak || Spacewatch || EOS || align=right | 2.6 km || 
|-id=171 bgcolor=#d6d6d6
| 276171 ||  || — || August 6, 2002 || Palomar || NEAT || — || align=right | 2.7 km || 
|-id=172 bgcolor=#d6d6d6
| 276172 ||  || — || August 6, 2002 || Palomar || NEAT || — || align=right | 5.2 km || 
|-id=173 bgcolor=#d6d6d6
| 276173 ||  || — || August 13, 2002 || Palomar || NEAT || — || align=right | 3.2 km || 
|-id=174 bgcolor=#fefefe
| 276174 ||  || — || August 12, 2002 || Socorro || LINEAR || FLO || align=right data-sort-value="0.82" | 820 m || 
|-id=175 bgcolor=#d6d6d6
| 276175 ||  || — || August 12, 2002 || Socorro || LINEAR || VER || align=right | 3.6 km || 
|-id=176 bgcolor=#d6d6d6
| 276176 ||  || — || August 12, 2002 || Socorro || LINEAR || — || align=right | 4.6 km || 
|-id=177 bgcolor=#d6d6d6
| 276177 ||  || — || August 13, 2002 || Palomar || NEAT || — || align=right | 3.7 km || 
|-id=178 bgcolor=#d6d6d6
| 276178 ||  || — || August 13, 2002 || Anderson Mesa || LONEOS || EOS || align=right | 2.0 km || 
|-id=179 bgcolor=#fefefe
| 276179 ||  || — || August 13, 2002 || Anderson Mesa || LONEOS || — || align=right data-sort-value="0.82" | 820 m || 
|-id=180 bgcolor=#d6d6d6
| 276180 ||  || — || August 13, 2002 || Anderson Mesa || LONEOS || — || align=right | 5.4 km || 
|-id=181 bgcolor=#d6d6d6
| 276181 ||  || — || August 13, 2002 || Anderson Mesa || LONEOS || — || align=right | 4.8 km || 
|-id=182 bgcolor=#d6d6d6
| 276182 ||  || — || August 8, 2002 || Palomar || NEAT || EOS || align=right | 2.3 km || 
|-id=183 bgcolor=#E9E9E9
| 276183 ||  || — || August 8, 2002 || Palomar || S. F. Hönig || — || align=right | 2.6 km || 
|-id=184 bgcolor=#fefefe
| 276184 ||  || — || August 8, 2002 || Palomar || S. F. Hönig || — || align=right | 1.0 km || 
|-id=185 bgcolor=#d6d6d6
| 276185 ||  || — || August 11, 2002 || Palomar || NEAT || — || align=right | 4.1 km || 
|-id=186 bgcolor=#d6d6d6
| 276186 ||  || — || August 14, 2002 || Socorro || LINEAR || — || align=right | 5.7 km || 
|-id=187 bgcolor=#d6d6d6
| 276187 ||  || — || August 8, 2002 || Palomar || NEAT || — || align=right | 2.8 km || 
|-id=188 bgcolor=#d6d6d6
| 276188 ||  || — || August 11, 2002 || Palomar || NEAT || — || align=right | 2.7 km || 
|-id=189 bgcolor=#d6d6d6
| 276189 ||  || — || August 8, 2002 || Palomar || NEAT || HYG || align=right | 3.0 km || 
|-id=190 bgcolor=#d6d6d6
| 276190 ||  || — || August 7, 2002 || Palomar || NEAT || — || align=right | 3.3 km || 
|-id=191 bgcolor=#fefefe
| 276191 ||  || — || March 7, 2001 || Haleakala || NEAT || — || align=right | 1.7 km || 
|-id=192 bgcolor=#d6d6d6
| 276192 ||  || — || September 6, 2008 || Mount Lemmon || Mount Lemmon Survey || — || align=right | 3.1 km || 
|-id=193 bgcolor=#fefefe
| 276193 ||  || — || August 16, 2002 || Palomar || NEAT || — || align=right data-sort-value="0.83" | 830 m || 
|-id=194 bgcolor=#d6d6d6
| 276194 ||  || — || August 26, 2002 || Palomar || NEAT || BRA || align=right | 1.6 km || 
|-id=195 bgcolor=#d6d6d6
| 276195 ||  || — || August 28, 2002 || Palomar || NEAT || — || align=right | 3.7 km || 
|-id=196 bgcolor=#E9E9E9
| 276196 ||  || — || August 28, 2002 || Palomar || NEAT || — || align=right | 3.9 km || 
|-id=197 bgcolor=#fefefe
| 276197 ||  || — || August 28, 2002 || Palomar || NEAT || — || align=right | 1.0 km || 
|-id=198 bgcolor=#fefefe
| 276198 ||  || — || August 29, 2002 || Palomar || NEAT || NYS || align=right data-sort-value="0.75" | 750 m || 
|-id=199 bgcolor=#d6d6d6
| 276199 ||  || — || August 29, 2002 || Palomar || S. F. Hönig || — || align=right | 2.9 km || 
|-id=200 bgcolor=#d6d6d6
| 276200 ||  || — || August 29, 2002 || Palomar || S. F. Hönig || — || align=right | 3.2 km || 
|}

276201–276300 

|-bgcolor=#d6d6d6
| 276201 ||  || — || August 17, 2002 || Palomar || A. Lowe || — || align=right | 3.0 km || 
|-id=202 bgcolor=#d6d6d6
| 276202 ||  || — || August 17, 2002 || Palomar || A. Lowe || — || align=right | 3.2 km || 
|-id=203 bgcolor=#d6d6d6
| 276203 ||  || — || August 29, 2002 || Palomar || NEAT || URS || align=right | 3.3 km || 
|-id=204 bgcolor=#fefefe
| 276204 ||  || — || August 29, 2002 || Palomar || NEAT || — || align=right data-sort-value="0.58" | 580 m || 
|-id=205 bgcolor=#d6d6d6
| 276205 ||  || — || August 17, 2002 || Palomar || NEAT || BRA || align=right | 1.6 km || 
|-id=206 bgcolor=#d6d6d6
| 276206 ||  || — || August 18, 2002 || Palomar || NEAT || — || align=right | 3.5 km || 
|-id=207 bgcolor=#d6d6d6
| 276207 ||  || — || August 30, 2002 || Palomar || NEAT || — || align=right | 4.7 km || 
|-id=208 bgcolor=#d6d6d6
| 276208 ||  || — || August 30, 2002 || Palomar || NEAT || — || align=right | 3.9 km || 
|-id=209 bgcolor=#d6d6d6
| 276209 ||  || — || August 17, 2002 || Palomar || NEAT || — || align=right | 3.0 km || 
|-id=210 bgcolor=#fefefe
| 276210 ||  || — || August 17, 2002 || Palomar || NEAT || — || align=right data-sort-value="0.80" | 800 m || 
|-id=211 bgcolor=#fefefe
| 276211 ||  || — || August 29, 2002 || Palomar || NEAT || — || align=right data-sort-value="0.78" | 780 m || 
|-id=212 bgcolor=#fefefe
| 276212 ||  || — || August 30, 2002 || Palomar || NEAT || FLO || align=right data-sort-value="0.66" | 660 m || 
|-id=213 bgcolor=#d6d6d6
| 276213 ||  || — || August 26, 2002 || Palomar || NEAT || EOS || align=right | 2.0 km || 
|-id=214 bgcolor=#d6d6d6
| 276214 ||  || — || August 18, 2002 || Palomar || NEAT || — || align=right | 3.2 km || 
|-id=215 bgcolor=#d6d6d6
| 276215 ||  || — || August 17, 2002 || Palomar || NEAT || — || align=right | 3.2 km || 
|-id=216 bgcolor=#fefefe
| 276216 ||  || — || August 17, 2002 || Palomar || NEAT || — || align=right data-sort-value="0.90" | 900 m || 
|-id=217 bgcolor=#d6d6d6
| 276217 ||  || — || August 17, 2002 || Palomar || NEAT || — || align=right | 2.9 km || 
|-id=218 bgcolor=#fefefe
| 276218 ||  || — || August 27, 2002 || Palomar || NEAT || FLO || align=right data-sort-value="0.74" | 740 m || 
|-id=219 bgcolor=#d6d6d6
| 276219 ||  || — || August 16, 2002 || Palomar || NEAT || — || align=right | 3.5 km || 
|-id=220 bgcolor=#d6d6d6
| 276220 ||  || — || August 16, 2002 || Palomar || NEAT || — || align=right | 3.7 km || 
|-id=221 bgcolor=#d6d6d6
| 276221 ||  || — || August 16, 2002 || Palomar || NEAT || — || align=right | 3.1 km || 
|-id=222 bgcolor=#E9E9E9
| 276222 ||  || — || August 18, 2002 || Palomar || NEAT || HOF || align=right | 2.8 km || 
|-id=223 bgcolor=#d6d6d6
| 276223 ||  || — || August 19, 2002 || Palomar || NEAT || — || align=right | 3.7 km || 
|-id=224 bgcolor=#d6d6d6
| 276224 ||  || — || August 19, 2002 || Palomar || NEAT || — || align=right | 3.6 km || 
|-id=225 bgcolor=#fefefe
| 276225 ||  || — || August 17, 2002 || Palomar || NEAT || FLO || align=right data-sort-value="0.91" | 910 m || 
|-id=226 bgcolor=#d6d6d6
| 276226 ||  || — || August 30, 2002 || Palomar || NEAT || EOS || align=right | 2.5 km || 
|-id=227 bgcolor=#d6d6d6
| 276227 ||  || — || August 30, 2002 || Palomar || NEAT || — || align=right | 3.2 km || 
|-id=228 bgcolor=#d6d6d6
| 276228 ||  || — || August 30, 2002 || Palomar || NEAT || — || align=right | 3.1 km || 
|-id=229 bgcolor=#d6d6d6
| 276229 ||  || — || November 20, 2003 || Kitt Peak || Spacewatch || — || align=right | 2.7 km || 
|-id=230 bgcolor=#d6d6d6
| 276230 ||  || — || April 8, 2006 || Kitt Peak || Spacewatch || — || align=right | 3.7 km || 
|-id=231 bgcolor=#fefefe
| 276231 ||  || — || September 17, 2006 || Kitt Peak || Spacewatch || MAS || align=right data-sort-value="0.74" | 740 m || 
|-id=232 bgcolor=#d6d6d6
| 276232 ||  || — || September 29, 1997 || Kitt Peak || Spacewatch || — || align=right | 3.4 km || 
|-id=233 bgcolor=#fefefe
| 276233 ||  || — || September 4, 2002 || Anderson Mesa || LONEOS || — || align=right | 1.0 km || 
|-id=234 bgcolor=#fefefe
| 276234 ||  || — || September 4, 2002 || Anderson Mesa || LONEOS || FLO || align=right data-sort-value="0.73" | 730 m || 
|-id=235 bgcolor=#fefefe
| 276235 ||  || — || September 5, 2002 || Anderson Mesa || LONEOS || FLO || align=right data-sort-value="0.84" | 840 m || 
|-id=236 bgcolor=#fefefe
| 276236 ||  || — || September 5, 2002 || Anderson Mesa || LONEOS || — || align=right | 1.1 km || 
|-id=237 bgcolor=#fefefe
| 276237 ||  || — || September 5, 2002 || Anderson Mesa || LONEOS || FLO || align=right data-sort-value="0.77" | 770 m || 
|-id=238 bgcolor=#fefefe
| 276238 ||  || — || September 3, 2002 || Palomar || NEAT || V || align=right | 1.0 km || 
|-id=239 bgcolor=#fefefe
| 276239 ||  || — || September 5, 2002 || Socorro || LINEAR || EUT || align=right data-sort-value="0.88" | 880 m || 
|-id=240 bgcolor=#fefefe
| 276240 ||  || — || September 5, 2002 || Socorro || LINEAR || — || align=right data-sort-value="0.89" | 890 m || 
|-id=241 bgcolor=#fefefe
| 276241 ||  || — || September 5, 2002 || Socorro || LINEAR || V || align=right data-sort-value="0.97" | 970 m || 
|-id=242 bgcolor=#d6d6d6
| 276242 ||  || — || September 5, 2002 || Socorro || LINEAR || — || align=right | 3.0 km || 
|-id=243 bgcolor=#fefefe
| 276243 ||  || — || September 7, 2002 || Ondřejov || P. Pravec, P. Kušnirák || — || align=right data-sort-value="0.81" | 810 m || 
|-id=244 bgcolor=#d6d6d6
| 276244 ||  || — || September 10, 2002 || Palomar || NEAT || TIR || align=right | 3.4 km || 
|-id=245 bgcolor=#d6d6d6
| 276245 ||  || — || September 11, 2002 || Palomar || NEAT || HYG || align=right | 3.4 km || 
|-id=246 bgcolor=#d6d6d6
| 276246 ||  || — || September 11, 2002 || Palomar || NEAT || EOS || align=right | 2.6 km || 
|-id=247 bgcolor=#fefefe
| 276247 ||  || — || September 7, 2002 || Socorro || LINEAR || FLO || align=right data-sort-value="0.80" | 800 m || 
|-id=248 bgcolor=#fefefe
| 276248 ||  || — || September 12, 2002 || Palomar || NEAT || — || align=right data-sort-value="0.94" | 940 m || 
|-id=249 bgcolor=#fefefe
| 276249 ||  || — || September 12, 2002 || Palomar || NEAT || — || align=right | 1.0 km || 
|-id=250 bgcolor=#fefefe
| 276250 ||  || — || September 12, 2002 || Palomar || NEAT || V || align=right data-sort-value="0.62" | 620 m || 
|-id=251 bgcolor=#fefefe
| 276251 ||  || — || September 13, 2002 || Palomar || NEAT || FLO || align=right data-sort-value="0.84" | 840 m || 
|-id=252 bgcolor=#d6d6d6
| 276252 ||  || — || September 13, 2002 || Palomar || NEAT || — || align=right | 4.2 km || 
|-id=253 bgcolor=#fefefe
| 276253 ||  || — || September 13, 2002 || Socorro || LINEAR || — || align=right | 1.1 km || 
|-id=254 bgcolor=#fefefe
| 276254 ||  || — || September 14, 2002 || Palomar || NEAT || — || align=right data-sort-value="0.77" | 770 m || 
|-id=255 bgcolor=#d6d6d6
| 276255 ||  || — || September 13, 2002 || Palomar || NEAT || EUP || align=right | 5.5 km || 
|-id=256 bgcolor=#fefefe
| 276256 ||  || — || September 13, 2002 || Palomar || NEAT || — || align=right data-sort-value="0.88" | 880 m || 
|-id=257 bgcolor=#d6d6d6
| 276257 ||  || — || September 13, 2002 || Palomar || R. Matson || — || align=right | 3.7 km || 
|-id=258 bgcolor=#fefefe
| 276258 ||  || — || September 12, 2002 || Palomar || NEAT || MAS || align=right data-sort-value="0.70" | 700 m || 
|-id=259 bgcolor=#fefefe
| 276259 ||  || — || September 14, 2002 || Palomar || NEAT || — || align=right data-sort-value="0.60" | 600 m || 
|-id=260 bgcolor=#d6d6d6
| 276260 ||  || — || September 4, 2002 || Palomar || NEAT || — || align=right | 3.1 km || 
|-id=261 bgcolor=#d6d6d6
| 276261 ||  || — || September 4, 2002 || Palomar || NEAT || — || align=right | 2.5 km || 
|-id=262 bgcolor=#d6d6d6
| 276262 ||  || — || September 4, 2002 || Palomar || NEAT || HYG || align=right | 3.8 km || 
|-id=263 bgcolor=#d6d6d6
| 276263 ||  || — || September 4, 2002 || Palomar || NEAT || EOS || align=right | 2.5 km || 
|-id=264 bgcolor=#d6d6d6
| 276264 ||  || — || September 12, 2002 || Palomar || NEAT || — || align=right | 2.4 km || 
|-id=265 bgcolor=#d6d6d6
| 276265 ||  || — || September 14, 2002 || Palomar || NEAT || — || align=right | 3.8 km || 
|-id=266 bgcolor=#d6d6d6
| 276266 ||  || — || September 15, 2002 || Palomar || NEAT || — || align=right | 3.1 km || 
|-id=267 bgcolor=#d6d6d6
| 276267 ||  || — || September 27, 2002 || Palomar || NEAT || EOS || align=right | 2.8 km || 
|-id=268 bgcolor=#d6d6d6
| 276268 ||  || — || September 27, 2002 || Palomar || NEAT || THM || align=right | 3.0 km || 
|-id=269 bgcolor=#fefefe
| 276269 ||  || — || September 26, 2002 || Palomar || NEAT || — || align=right data-sort-value="0.98" | 980 m || 
|-id=270 bgcolor=#d6d6d6
| 276270 ||  || — || September 27, 2002 || Socorro || LINEAR || — || align=right | 4.9 km || 
|-id=271 bgcolor=#d6d6d6
| 276271 ||  || — || September 28, 2002 || Haleakala || NEAT || — || align=right | 4.4 km || 
|-id=272 bgcolor=#d6d6d6
| 276272 ||  || — || September 28, 2002 || Haleakala || NEAT || — || align=right | 4.2 km || 
|-id=273 bgcolor=#fefefe
| 276273 ||  || — || September 28, 2002 || Haleakala || NEAT || — || align=right | 1.0 km || 
|-id=274 bgcolor=#FA8072
| 276274 ||  || — || September 30, 2002 || Haleakala || NEAT || AMO +1km || align=right | 1.5 km || 
|-id=275 bgcolor=#fefefe
| 276275 ||  || — || September 30, 2002 || Haleakala || NEAT || — || align=right | 1.2 km || 
|-id=276 bgcolor=#E9E9E9
| 276276 ||  || — || September 16, 2002 || Palomar || NEAT || — || align=right data-sort-value="0.98" | 980 m || 
|-id=277 bgcolor=#d6d6d6
| 276277 ||  || — || September 27, 2002 || Palomar || NEAT || EUP || align=right | 5.1 km || 
|-id=278 bgcolor=#fefefe
| 276278 ||  || — || September 16, 2002 || Palomar || NEAT || — || align=right data-sort-value="0.98" | 980 m || 
|-id=279 bgcolor=#d6d6d6
| 276279 ||  || — || September 16, 2002 || Palomar || NEAT || — || align=right | 2.9 km || 
|-id=280 bgcolor=#fefefe
| 276280 ||  || — || October 1, 2002 || Anderson Mesa || LONEOS || — || align=right data-sort-value="0.99" | 990 m || 
|-id=281 bgcolor=#fefefe
| 276281 ||  || — || October 1, 2002 || Anderson Mesa || LONEOS || NYS || align=right data-sort-value="0.71" | 710 m || 
|-id=282 bgcolor=#fefefe
| 276282 ||  || — || October 1, 2002 || Haleakala || NEAT || NYS || align=right | 2.4 km || 
|-id=283 bgcolor=#d6d6d6
| 276283 ||  || — || October 1, 2002 || Anderson Mesa || LONEOS || — || align=right | 3.1 km || 
|-id=284 bgcolor=#d6d6d6
| 276284 ||  || — || October 2, 2002 || Socorro || LINEAR || HIL3:2 || align=right | 5.9 km || 
|-id=285 bgcolor=#fefefe
| 276285 ||  || — || October 2, 2002 || Socorro || LINEAR || — || align=right data-sort-value="0.86" | 860 m || 
|-id=286 bgcolor=#fefefe
| 276286 ||  || — || October 2, 2002 || Socorro || LINEAR || NYS || align=right data-sort-value="0.84" | 840 m || 
|-id=287 bgcolor=#fefefe
| 276287 ||  || — || October 2, 2002 || Socorro || LINEAR || NYS || align=right data-sort-value="0.86" | 860 m || 
|-id=288 bgcolor=#fefefe
| 276288 ||  || — || October 2, 2002 || Socorro || LINEAR || — || align=right | 1.1 km || 
|-id=289 bgcolor=#fefefe
| 276289 ||  || — || October 2, 2002 || Socorro || LINEAR || — || align=right data-sort-value="0.82" | 820 m || 
|-id=290 bgcolor=#fefefe
| 276290 ||  || — || October 2, 2002 || Socorro || LINEAR || — || align=right | 1.0 km || 
|-id=291 bgcolor=#fefefe
| 276291 ||  || — || October 3, 2002 || Palomar || NEAT || H || align=right data-sort-value="0.96" | 960 m || 
|-id=292 bgcolor=#fefefe
| 276292 ||  || — || October 1, 2002 || Anderson Mesa || LONEOS || — || align=right | 2.1 km || 
|-id=293 bgcolor=#fefefe
| 276293 ||  || — || October 3, 2002 || Palomar || NEAT || — || align=right | 1.0 km || 
|-id=294 bgcolor=#d6d6d6
| 276294 ||  || — || October 3, 2002 || Palomar || NEAT || EMA || align=right | 5.9 km || 
|-id=295 bgcolor=#FA8072
| 276295 ||  || — || October 3, 2002 || Palomar || NEAT || — || align=right data-sort-value="0.95" | 950 m || 
|-id=296 bgcolor=#fefefe
| 276296 ||  || — || October 3, 2002 || Palomar || NEAT || FLO || align=right data-sort-value="0.98" | 980 m || 
|-id=297 bgcolor=#FA8072
| 276297 ||  || — || October 1, 2002 || Haleakala || NEAT || — || align=right data-sort-value="0.93" | 930 m || 
|-id=298 bgcolor=#fefefe
| 276298 ||  || — || October 4, 2002 || Socorro || LINEAR || FLO || align=right data-sort-value="0.76" | 760 m || 
|-id=299 bgcolor=#fefefe
| 276299 ||  || — || October 3, 2002 || Palomar || NEAT || — || align=right | 1.0 km || 
|-id=300 bgcolor=#E9E9E9
| 276300 ||  || — || October 3, 2002 || Palomar || NEAT || DOR || align=right | 3.6 km || 
|}

276301–276400 

|-bgcolor=#E9E9E9
| 276301 ||  || — || October 3, 2002 || Palomar || NEAT || — || align=right | 1.2 km || 
|-id=302 bgcolor=#E9E9E9
| 276302 ||  || — || October 4, 2002 || Palomar || NEAT || — || align=right | 1.2 km || 
|-id=303 bgcolor=#d6d6d6
| 276303 ||  || — || October 4, 2002 || Palomar || NEAT || — || align=right | 4.7 km || 
|-id=304 bgcolor=#d6d6d6
| 276304 ||  || — || October 4, 2002 || Socorro || LINEAR || NAE || align=right | 4.8 km || 
|-id=305 bgcolor=#d6d6d6
| 276305 ||  || — || October 13, 2002 || Powell || Powell Obs. || — || align=right | 4.8 km || 
|-id=306 bgcolor=#d6d6d6
| 276306 ||  || — || October 3, 2002 || Socorro || LINEAR || THM || align=right | 2.4 km || 
|-id=307 bgcolor=#fefefe
| 276307 ||  || — || October 4, 2002 || Socorro || LINEAR || — || align=right | 1.0 km || 
|-id=308 bgcolor=#d6d6d6
| 276308 ||  || — || October 5, 2002 || Palomar || NEAT || — || align=right | 3.9 km || 
|-id=309 bgcolor=#d6d6d6
| 276309 ||  || — || October 5, 2002 || Palomar || NEAT || — || align=right | 4.0 km || 
|-id=310 bgcolor=#d6d6d6
| 276310 ||  || — || October 5, 2002 || Palomar || NEAT || — || align=right | 4.0 km || 
|-id=311 bgcolor=#d6d6d6
| 276311 ||  || — || October 5, 2002 || Palomar || NEAT || — || align=right | 4.2 km || 
|-id=312 bgcolor=#d6d6d6
| 276312 ||  || — || October 3, 2002 || Palomar || NEAT || — || align=right | 6.5 km || 
|-id=313 bgcolor=#fefefe
| 276313 ||  || — || October 3, 2002 || Palomar || NEAT || — || align=right | 2.1 km || 
|-id=314 bgcolor=#d6d6d6
| 276314 ||  || — || October 3, 2002 || Palomar || NEAT || — || align=right | 3.7 km || 
|-id=315 bgcolor=#d6d6d6
| 276315 ||  || — || October 3, 2002 || Palomar || NEAT || — || align=right | 4.1 km || 
|-id=316 bgcolor=#fefefe
| 276316 ||  || — || October 4, 2002 || Socorro || LINEAR || — || align=right | 1.0 km || 
|-id=317 bgcolor=#d6d6d6
| 276317 ||  || — || October 12, 2002 || Socorro || LINEAR || — || align=right | 6.6 km || 
|-id=318 bgcolor=#d6d6d6
| 276318 ||  || — || October 14, 2002 || Socorro || LINEAR || — || align=right | 3.8 km || 
|-id=319 bgcolor=#d6d6d6
| 276319 ||  || — || October 4, 2002 || Socorro || LINEAR || TIR || align=right | 3.5 km || 
|-id=320 bgcolor=#fefefe
| 276320 ||  || — || October 3, 2002 || Socorro || LINEAR || FLO || align=right | 1.0 km || 
|-id=321 bgcolor=#fefefe
| 276321 ||  || — || October 4, 2002 || Socorro || LINEAR || FLO || align=right data-sort-value="0.84" | 840 m || 
|-id=322 bgcolor=#fefefe
| 276322 ||  || — || October 4, 2002 || Socorro || LINEAR || FLOfast? || align=right data-sort-value="0.96" | 960 m || 
|-id=323 bgcolor=#E9E9E9
| 276323 ||  || — || October 4, 2002 || Socorro || LINEAR || — || align=right | 6.5 km || 
|-id=324 bgcolor=#E9E9E9
| 276324 ||  || — || October 4, 2002 || Socorro || LINEAR || — || align=right | 1.3 km || 
|-id=325 bgcolor=#d6d6d6
| 276325 ||  || — || October 7, 2002 || Haleakala || NEAT || EOS || align=right | 2.5 km || 
|-id=326 bgcolor=#E9E9E9
| 276326 ||  || — || October 6, 2002 || Palomar || NEAT || — || align=right | 1.1 km || 
|-id=327 bgcolor=#fefefe
| 276327 ||  || — || October 9, 2002 || Anderson Mesa || LONEOS || — || align=right | 1.4 km || 
|-id=328 bgcolor=#d6d6d6
| 276328 ||  || — || October 7, 2002 || Kitt Peak || Spacewatch || — || align=right | 4.0 km || 
|-id=329 bgcolor=#d6d6d6
| 276329 ||  || — || October 7, 2002 || Haleakala || NEAT || HYG || align=right | 3.6 km || 
|-id=330 bgcolor=#E9E9E9
| 276330 ||  || — || October 8, 2002 || Kitt Peak || Spacewatch || MAR || align=right data-sort-value="0.97" | 970 m || 
|-id=331 bgcolor=#FA8072
| 276331 ||  || — || October 9, 2002 || Socorro || LINEAR || — || align=right | 1.3 km || 
|-id=332 bgcolor=#d6d6d6
| 276332 ||  || — || October 9, 2002 || Socorro || LINEAR || — || align=right | 4.4 km || 
|-id=333 bgcolor=#fefefe
| 276333 ||  || — || October 10, 2002 || Kitt Peak || Spacewatch || — || align=right data-sort-value="0.88" | 880 m || 
|-id=334 bgcolor=#d6d6d6
| 276334 ||  || — || October 9, 2002 || Socorro || LINEAR || — || align=right | 6.5 km || 
|-id=335 bgcolor=#E9E9E9
| 276335 ||  || — || October 12, 2002 || Socorro || LINEAR || — || align=right | 1.1 km || 
|-id=336 bgcolor=#d6d6d6
| 276336 ||  || — || October 4, 2002 || Apache Point || SDSS || — || align=right | 3.7 km || 
|-id=337 bgcolor=#d6d6d6
| 276337 ||  || — || October 4, 2002 || Apache Point || SDSS || ELF || align=right | 4.0 km || 
|-id=338 bgcolor=#d6d6d6
| 276338 ||  || — || October 4, 2002 || Apache Point || SDSS || — || align=right | 4.7 km || 
|-id=339 bgcolor=#d6d6d6
| 276339 ||  || — || October 5, 2002 || Apache Point || SDSS || — || align=right | 3.7 km || 
|-id=340 bgcolor=#d6d6d6
| 276340 ||  || — || October 5, 2002 || Apache Point || SDSS || — || align=right | 4.7 km || 
|-id=341 bgcolor=#d6d6d6
| 276341 ||  || — || October 5, 2002 || Apache Point || SDSS || — || align=right | 4.0 km || 
|-id=342 bgcolor=#d6d6d6
| 276342 ||  || — || October 10, 2002 || Apache Point || SDSS || EOS || align=right | 2.6 km || 
|-id=343 bgcolor=#d6d6d6
| 276343 ||  || — || October 10, 2002 || Apache Point || SDSS || — || align=right | 3.9 km || 
|-id=344 bgcolor=#fefefe
| 276344 ||  || — || October 10, 2002 || Apache Point || SDSS || FLO || align=right data-sort-value="0.77" | 770 m || 
|-id=345 bgcolor=#fefefe
| 276345 ||  || — || October 10, 2002 || Apache Point || SDSS || V || align=right data-sort-value="0.79" | 790 m || 
|-id=346 bgcolor=#d6d6d6
| 276346 ||  || — || October 5, 2002 || Anderson Mesa || LONEOS || EUP || align=right | 5.7 km || 
|-id=347 bgcolor=#d6d6d6
| 276347 ||  || — || October 9, 2002 || Palomar || NEAT || EOS || align=right | 2.2 km || 
|-id=348 bgcolor=#d6d6d6
| 276348 ||  || — || October 5, 2002 || Palomar || NEAT || — || align=right | 3.0 km || 
|-id=349 bgcolor=#fefefe
| 276349 ||  || — || October 9, 2002 || Palomar || NEAT || — || align=right data-sort-value="0.79" | 790 m || 
|-id=350 bgcolor=#E9E9E9
| 276350 ||  || — || October 29, 2002 || Palomar || NEAT || EUN || align=right | 1.4 km || 
|-id=351 bgcolor=#d6d6d6
| 276351 ||  || — || October 30, 2002 || Socorro || LINEAR || TIR || align=right | 3.7 km || 
|-id=352 bgcolor=#d6d6d6
| 276352 ||  || — || October 30, 2002 || Palomar || NEAT || — || align=right | 4.0 km || 
|-id=353 bgcolor=#fefefe
| 276353 ||  || — || October 28, 2002 || Kvistaberg || UDAS || — || align=right data-sort-value="0.93" | 930 m || 
|-id=354 bgcolor=#d6d6d6
| 276354 ||  || — || October 31, 2002 || Palomar || NEAT || — || align=right | 4.4 km || 
|-id=355 bgcolor=#d6d6d6
| 276355 ||  || — || October 29, 2002 || Apache Point || SDSS || MEL || align=right | 3.7 km || 
|-id=356 bgcolor=#d6d6d6
| 276356 ||  || — || October 29, 2002 || Apache Point || SDSS || — || align=right | 3.5 km || 
|-id=357 bgcolor=#d6d6d6
| 276357 ||  || — || October 29, 2002 || Apache Point || SDSS || — || align=right | 2.9 km || 
|-id=358 bgcolor=#d6d6d6
| 276358 ||  || — || October 30, 2002 || Apache Point || SDSS || — || align=right | 5.8 km || 
|-id=359 bgcolor=#fefefe
| 276359 ||  || — || October 18, 2002 || Palomar || NEAT || — || align=right data-sort-value="0.97" | 970 m || 
|-id=360 bgcolor=#fefefe
| 276360 ||  || — || November 1, 2002 || Palomar || NEAT || — || align=right data-sort-value="0.89" | 890 m || 
|-id=361 bgcolor=#fefefe
| 276361 ||  || — || November 5, 2002 || Wrightwood || J. W. Young || — || align=right data-sort-value="0.99" | 990 m || 
|-id=362 bgcolor=#d6d6d6
| 276362 ||  || — || November 2, 2002 || Haleakala || NEAT || — || align=right | 3.3 km || 
|-id=363 bgcolor=#fefefe
| 276363 ||  || — || November 4, 2002 || Haleakala || NEAT || — || align=right data-sort-value="0.94" | 940 m || 
|-id=364 bgcolor=#fefefe
| 276364 ||  || — || November 5, 2002 || Kvistaberg || UDAS || FLO || align=right data-sort-value="0.99" | 990 m || 
|-id=365 bgcolor=#fefefe
| 276365 ||  || — || November 5, 2002 || Socorro || LINEAR || ERI || align=right | 2.1 km || 
|-id=366 bgcolor=#fefefe
| 276366 ||  || — || November 2, 2002 || Haleakala || NEAT || NYS || align=right data-sort-value="0.81" | 810 m || 
|-id=367 bgcolor=#fefefe
| 276367 ||  || — || November 5, 2002 || Socorro || LINEAR || — || align=right | 1.1 km || 
|-id=368 bgcolor=#fefefe
| 276368 ||  || — || November 5, 2002 || Socorro || LINEAR || — || align=right | 1.2 km || 
|-id=369 bgcolor=#d6d6d6
| 276369 ||  || — || November 5, 2002 || Socorro || LINEAR || EOS || align=right | 3.0 km || 
|-id=370 bgcolor=#fefefe
| 276370 ||  || — || November 5, 2002 || Socorro || LINEAR || — || align=right | 1.3 km || 
|-id=371 bgcolor=#fefefe
| 276371 ||  || — || November 3, 2002 || Haleakala || NEAT || — || align=right | 1.1 km || 
|-id=372 bgcolor=#fefefe
| 276372 ||  || — || November 7, 2002 || Socorro || LINEAR || FLO || align=right data-sort-value="0.89" | 890 m || 
|-id=373 bgcolor=#fefefe
| 276373 ||  || — || November 7, 2002 || Socorro || LINEAR || — || align=right | 1.1 km || 
|-id=374 bgcolor=#fefefe
| 276374 ||  || — || November 8, 2002 || Socorro || LINEAR || PHO || align=right | 1.5 km || 
|-id=375 bgcolor=#fefefe
| 276375 ||  || — || November 11, 2002 || Socorro || LINEAR || FLO || align=right data-sort-value="0.80" | 800 m || 
|-id=376 bgcolor=#fefefe
| 276376 ||  || — || November 11, 2002 || Socorro || LINEAR || — || align=right | 1.1 km || 
|-id=377 bgcolor=#fefefe
| 276377 ||  || — || November 12, 2002 || Socorro || LINEAR || — || align=right | 1.4 km || 
|-id=378 bgcolor=#fefefe
| 276378 ||  || — || November 11, 2002 || Anderson Mesa || LONEOS || V || align=right data-sort-value="0.91" | 910 m || 
|-id=379 bgcolor=#fefefe
| 276379 ||  || — || November 15, 2002 || Palomar || NEAT || PHO || align=right | 1.5 km || 
|-id=380 bgcolor=#d6d6d6
| 276380 ||  || — || November 11, 2002 || Goodricke-Pigott || R. A. Tucker || ALA || align=right | 5.2 km || 
|-id=381 bgcolor=#fefefe
| 276381 ||  || — || November 5, 2002 || Palomar || NEAT || NYS || align=right | 1.6 km || 
|-id=382 bgcolor=#d6d6d6
| 276382 ||  || — || November 14, 2002 || Palomar || NEAT || — || align=right | 3.8 km || 
|-id=383 bgcolor=#fefefe
| 276383 ||  || — || November 4, 2002 || Palomar || NEAT || — || align=right data-sort-value="0.81" | 810 m || 
|-id=384 bgcolor=#fefefe
| 276384 ||  || — || November 23, 2002 || Palomar || NEAT || — || align=right data-sort-value="0.98" | 980 m || 
|-id=385 bgcolor=#d6d6d6
| 276385 ||  || — || November 24, 2002 || Palomar || NEAT || — || align=right | 4.0 km || 
|-id=386 bgcolor=#d6d6d6
| 276386 ||  || — || November 16, 2002 || Palomar || NEAT || SYL7:4 || align=right | 4.3 km || 
|-id=387 bgcolor=#fefefe
| 276387 ||  || — || November 25, 2002 || Palomar || NEAT || NYS || align=right data-sort-value="0.64" | 640 m || 
|-id=388 bgcolor=#d6d6d6
| 276388 ||  || — || November 24, 2002 || Palomar || NEAT || — || align=right | 4.3 km || 
|-id=389 bgcolor=#fefefe
| 276389 ||  || — || November 22, 2002 || Palomar || NEAT || — || align=right data-sort-value="0.90" | 900 m || 
|-id=390 bgcolor=#fefefe
| 276390 ||  || — || November 28, 2002 || Haleakala || NEAT || V || align=right data-sort-value="0.70" | 700 m || 
|-id=391 bgcolor=#fefefe
| 276391 ||  || — || December 1, 2002 || Socorro || LINEAR || FLO || align=right data-sort-value="0.80" | 800 m || 
|-id=392 bgcolor=#FFC2E0
| 276392 ||  || — || December 3, 2002 || Palomar || NEAT || AMO || align=right data-sort-value="0.46" | 460 m || 
|-id=393 bgcolor=#E9E9E9
| 276393 ||  || — || December 1, 2002 || Socorro || LINEAR || RAF || align=right | 1.4 km || 
|-id=394 bgcolor=#E9E9E9
| 276394 ||  || — || December 2, 2002 || Socorro || LINEAR || — || align=right | 1.2 km || 
|-id=395 bgcolor=#E9E9E9
| 276395 ||  || — || December 5, 2002 || Socorro || LINEAR || ADE || align=right | 3.1 km || 
|-id=396 bgcolor=#fefefe
| 276396 ||  || — || December 5, 2002 || Socorro || LINEAR || — || align=right | 2.1 km || 
|-id=397 bgcolor=#FFC2E0
| 276397 ||  || — || December 11, 2002 || Palomar || NEAT || AMO +1km || align=right | 1.3 km || 
|-id=398 bgcolor=#fefefe
| 276398 ||  || — || December 6, 2002 || Socorro || LINEAR || FLO || align=right | 1.0 km || 
|-id=399 bgcolor=#d6d6d6
| 276399 ||  || — || December 7, 2002 || Socorro || LINEAR || HYG || align=right | 3.8 km || 
|-id=400 bgcolor=#FA8072
| 276400 ||  || — || December 10, 2002 || Socorro || LINEAR || — || align=right | 1.5 km || 
|}

276401–276500 

|-bgcolor=#fefefe
| 276401 ||  || — || December 10, 2002 || Socorro || LINEAR || NYS || align=right data-sort-value="0.92" | 920 m || 
|-id=402 bgcolor=#fefefe
| 276402 ||  || — || December 11, 2002 || Socorro || LINEAR || — || align=right | 1.1 km || 
|-id=403 bgcolor=#fefefe
| 276403 ||  || — || December 11, 2002 || Socorro || LINEAR || FLO || align=right | 1.3 km || 
|-id=404 bgcolor=#fefefe
| 276404 ||  || — || December 13, 2002 || Socorro || LINEAR || — || align=right | 1.9 km || 
|-id=405 bgcolor=#fefefe
| 276405 ||  || — || December 5, 2002 || Socorro || LINEAR || MAS || align=right data-sort-value="0.79" | 790 m || 
|-id=406 bgcolor=#fefefe
| 276406 ||  || — || December 5, 2002 || Socorro || LINEAR || V || align=right data-sort-value="0.86" | 860 m || 
|-id=407 bgcolor=#fefefe
| 276407 ||  || — || December 5, 2002 || Socorro || LINEAR || NYS || align=right data-sort-value="0.74" | 740 m || 
|-id=408 bgcolor=#fefefe
| 276408 ||  || — || December 7, 2002 || Apache Point || SDSS || V || align=right | 1.0 km || 
|-id=409 bgcolor=#FFC2E0
| 276409 ||  || — || December 27, 2002 || Socorro || LINEAR || APO || align=right data-sort-value="0.70" | 700 m || 
|-id=410 bgcolor=#fefefe
| 276410 ||  || — || December 31, 2002 || Socorro || LINEAR || NYS || align=right data-sort-value="0.88" | 880 m || 
|-id=411 bgcolor=#fefefe
| 276411 ||  || — || December 31, 2002 || Socorro || LINEAR || — || align=right | 1.2 km || 
|-id=412 bgcolor=#E9E9E9
| 276412 ||  || — || December 31, 2002 || Socorro || LINEAR || — || align=right | 1.8 km || 
|-id=413 bgcolor=#fefefe
| 276413 ||  || — || January 1, 2003 || Socorro || LINEAR || — || align=right | 1.2 km || 
|-id=414 bgcolor=#fefefe
| 276414 ||  || — || January 5, 2003 || Socorro || LINEAR || NYS || align=right | 1.0 km || 
|-id=415 bgcolor=#d6d6d6
| 276415 ||  || — || January 4, 2003 || Socorro || LINEAR || EOS || align=right | 2.9 km || 
|-id=416 bgcolor=#E9E9E9
| 276416 ||  || — || January 5, 2003 || Socorro || LINEAR || JUN || align=right | 1.5 km || 
|-id=417 bgcolor=#E9E9E9
| 276417 ||  || — || January 5, 2003 || Socorro || LINEAR || — || align=right | 2.3 km || 
|-id=418 bgcolor=#fefefe
| 276418 ||  || — || January 5, 2003 || Socorro || LINEAR || — || align=right | 1.4 km || 
|-id=419 bgcolor=#E9E9E9
| 276419 ||  || — || January 5, 2003 || Socorro || LINEAR || — || align=right | 1.2 km || 
|-id=420 bgcolor=#E9E9E9
| 276420 ||  || — || January 11, 2003 || Socorro || LINEAR || — || align=right | 2.6 km || 
|-id=421 bgcolor=#E9E9E9
| 276421 ||  || — || January 12, 2003 || Kitt Peak || Spacewatch || — || align=right | 3.0 km || 
|-id=422 bgcolor=#E9E9E9
| 276422 ||  || — || January 5, 2003 || Anderson Mesa || LONEOS || — || align=right | 3.1 km || 
|-id=423 bgcolor=#fefefe
| 276423 ||  || — || January 25, 2003 || Socorro || LINEAR || H || align=right data-sort-value="0.91" | 910 m || 
|-id=424 bgcolor=#E9E9E9
| 276424 ||  || — || January 26, 2003 || Haleakala || NEAT || — || align=right | 1.3 km || 
|-id=425 bgcolor=#fefefe
| 276425 ||  || — || January 26, 2003 || Anderson Mesa || LONEOS || — || align=right | 1.9 km || 
|-id=426 bgcolor=#fefefe
| 276426 ||  || — || January 27, 2003 || Anderson Mesa || LONEOS || KLI || align=right | 2.5 km || 
|-id=427 bgcolor=#fefefe
| 276427 ||  || — || January 27, 2003 || Haleakala || NEAT || NYS || align=right data-sort-value="0.90" | 900 m || 
|-id=428 bgcolor=#fefefe
| 276428 ||  || — || January 27, 2003 || Kitt Peak || Spacewatch || — || align=right | 1.3 km || 
|-id=429 bgcolor=#fefefe
| 276429 ||  || — || January 27, 2003 || Anderson Mesa || LONEOS || NYS || align=right data-sort-value="0.82" | 820 m || 
|-id=430 bgcolor=#E9E9E9
| 276430 ||  || — || January 28, 2003 || Palomar || NEAT || DOR || align=right | 3.9 km || 
|-id=431 bgcolor=#fefefe
| 276431 ||  || — || January 30, 2003 || Anderson Mesa || LONEOS || — || align=right | 1.3 km || 
|-id=432 bgcolor=#E9E9E9
| 276432 ||  || — || January 30, 2003 || Haleakala || NEAT || — || align=right | 1.1 km || 
|-id=433 bgcolor=#fefefe
| 276433 ||  || — || January 30, 2003 || Haleakala || NEAT || — || align=right | 1.2 km || 
|-id=434 bgcolor=#fefefe
| 276434 ||  || — || January 28, 2003 || Socorro || LINEAR || — || align=right | 1.3 km || 
|-id=435 bgcolor=#E9E9E9
| 276435 ||  || — || February 1, 2003 || Socorro || LINEAR || — || align=right | 2.0 km || 
|-id=436 bgcolor=#E9E9E9
| 276436 ||  || — || February 7, 2003 || Kitt Peak || Spacewatch || — || align=right | 1.7 km || 
|-id=437 bgcolor=#fefefe
| 276437 ||  || — || February 8, 2003 || Socorro || LINEAR || — || align=right | 1.1 km || 
|-id=438 bgcolor=#fefefe
| 276438 ||  || — || February 8, 2003 || Socorro || LINEAR || CHL || align=right | 1.8 km || 
|-id=439 bgcolor=#fefefe
| 276439 ||  || — || February 10, 2003 || Bergisch Gladbac || W. Bickel || — || align=right data-sort-value="0.89" | 890 m || 
|-id=440 bgcolor=#fefefe
| 276440 ||  || — || February 3, 2003 || Haleakala || NEAT || H || align=right data-sort-value="0.70" | 700 m || 
|-id=441 bgcolor=#E9E9E9
| 276441 ||  || — || March 6, 2003 || Socorro || LINEAR || — || align=right | 1.1 km || 
|-id=442 bgcolor=#E9E9E9
| 276442 ||  || — || March 5, 2003 || Socorro || LINEAR || — || align=right | 1.2 km || 
|-id=443 bgcolor=#fefefe
| 276443 ||  || — || March 6, 2003 || Socorro || LINEAR || — || align=right | 1.2 km || 
|-id=444 bgcolor=#fefefe
| 276444 ||  || — || March 7, 2003 || Anderson Mesa || LONEOS || — || align=right | 1.2 km || 
|-id=445 bgcolor=#E9E9E9
| 276445 ||  || — || March 8, 2003 || Socorro || LINEAR || — || align=right | 3.6 km || 
|-id=446 bgcolor=#d6d6d6
| 276446 ||  || — || March 8, 2003 || Socorro || LINEAR || — || align=right | 5.3 km || 
|-id=447 bgcolor=#fefefe
| 276447 ||  || — || March 24, 2003 || Socorro || LINEAR || H || align=right data-sort-value="0.94" | 940 m || 
|-id=448 bgcolor=#fefefe
| 276448 ||  || — || March 31, 2003 || Socorro || LINEAR || H || align=right data-sort-value="0.62" | 620 m || 
|-id=449 bgcolor=#fefefe
| 276449 ||  || — || March 23, 2003 || Kitt Peak || Spacewatch || — || align=right | 1.1 km || 
|-id=450 bgcolor=#E9E9E9
| 276450 ||  || — || March 22, 2003 || Palomar || NEAT || — || align=right | 3.1 km || 
|-id=451 bgcolor=#E9E9E9
| 276451 ||  || — || March 23, 2003 || Catalina || CSS || — || align=right | 2.6 km || 
|-id=452 bgcolor=#d6d6d6
| 276452 ||  || — || March 25, 2003 || Haleakala || NEAT || — || align=right | 4.7 km || 
|-id=453 bgcolor=#fefefe
| 276453 ||  || — || March 27, 2003 || Socorro || LINEAR || — || align=right data-sort-value="0.86" | 860 m || 
|-id=454 bgcolor=#E9E9E9
| 276454 ||  || — || March 29, 2003 || Anderson Mesa || LONEOS || — || align=right | 2.3 km || 
|-id=455 bgcolor=#E9E9E9
| 276455 ||  || — || March 26, 2003 || Palomar || NEAT || — || align=right | 2.0 km || 
|-id=456 bgcolor=#E9E9E9
| 276456 ||  || — || March 31, 2003 || Anderson Mesa || LONEOS || — || align=right | 1.8 km || 
|-id=457 bgcolor=#E9E9E9
| 276457 ||  || — || March 31, 2003 || Anderson Mesa || LONEOS || — || align=right | 2.5 km || 
|-id=458 bgcolor=#E9E9E9
| 276458 ||  || — || April 1, 2003 || Socorro || LINEAR || RAF || align=right | 1.1 km || 
|-id=459 bgcolor=#E9E9E9
| 276459 ||  || — || April 3, 2003 || Haleakala || NEAT || BRU || align=right | 3.1 km || 
|-id=460 bgcolor=#E9E9E9
| 276460 ||  || — || April 7, 2003 || Palomar || NEAT || JUL || align=right | 1.6 km || 
|-id=461 bgcolor=#E9E9E9
| 276461 ||  || — || April 4, 2003 || Kitt Peak || Spacewatch || — || align=right | 1.5 km || 
|-id=462 bgcolor=#E9E9E9
| 276462 ||  || — || April 7, 2003 || Kitt Peak || Spacewatch || — || align=right | 1.2 km || 
|-id=463 bgcolor=#E9E9E9
| 276463 ||  || — || April 7, 2003 || Kitt Peak || Spacewatch || MAR || align=right | 1.3 km || 
|-id=464 bgcolor=#E9E9E9
| 276464 ||  || — || April 5, 2003 || Kitt Peak || Spacewatch || — || align=right data-sort-value="0.77" | 770 m || 
|-id=465 bgcolor=#E9E9E9
| 276465 ||  || — || April 24, 2003 || Anderson Mesa || LONEOS || — || align=right | 1.3 km || 
|-id=466 bgcolor=#E9E9E9
| 276466 ||  || — || April 22, 2003 || Goodricke-Pigott || J. W. Kessel || — || align=right | 4.1 km || 
|-id=467 bgcolor=#E9E9E9
| 276467 ||  || — || April 25, 2003 || Kitt Peak || Spacewatch || — || align=right data-sort-value="0.98" | 980 m || 
|-id=468 bgcolor=#FFC2E0
| 276468 ||  || — || April 29, 2003 || Haleakala || NEAT || AMO +1km || align=right | 1.0 km || 
|-id=469 bgcolor=#fefefe
| 276469 ||  || — || April 29, 2003 || Haleakala || NEAT || NYS || align=right data-sort-value="0.88" | 880 m || 
|-id=470 bgcolor=#E9E9E9
| 276470 ||  || — || May 2, 2003 || Socorro || LINEAR || — || align=right | 1.2 km || 
|-id=471 bgcolor=#E9E9E9
| 276471 ||  || — || May 23, 2003 || Wrightwood || J. W. Young || MAR || align=right | 1.3 km || 
|-id=472 bgcolor=#E9E9E9
| 276472 ||  || — || May 23, 2003 || Kitt Peak || Spacewatch || — || align=right data-sort-value="0.87" | 870 m || 
|-id=473 bgcolor=#d6d6d6
| 276473 ||  || — || May 27, 2003 || Anderson Mesa || LONEOS || EUP || align=right | 4.7 km || 
|-id=474 bgcolor=#E9E9E9
| 276474 ||  || — || May 26, 2003 || Kitt Peak || Spacewatch || — || align=right | 1.6 km || 
|-id=475 bgcolor=#E9E9E9
| 276475 ||  || — || May 28, 2003 || Haleakala || NEAT || — || align=right | 1.5 km || 
|-id=476 bgcolor=#E9E9E9
| 276476 ||  || — || June 25, 2003 || Anderson Mesa || LONEOS || — || align=right | 2.7 km || 
|-id=477 bgcolor=#E9E9E9
| 276477 ||  || — || June 26, 2003 || Socorro || LINEAR || — || align=right | 1.5 km || 
|-id=478 bgcolor=#E9E9E9
| 276478 ||  || — || June 24, 2003 || Bergisch Gladbac || W. Bickel || JUN || align=right | 1.2 km || 
|-id=479 bgcolor=#E9E9E9
| 276479 ||  || — || June 29, 2003 || Socorro || LINEAR || — || align=right | 2.3 km || 
|-id=480 bgcolor=#E9E9E9
| 276480 ||  || — || July 1, 2003 || Socorro || LINEAR || JUN || align=right | 1.2 km || 
|-id=481 bgcolor=#E9E9E9
| 276481 ||  || — || July 5, 2003 || Kitt Peak || Spacewatch || — || align=right | 2.1 km || 
|-id=482 bgcolor=#E9E9E9
| 276482 ||  || — || July 22, 2003 || Haleakala || NEAT || — || align=right | 5.8 km || 
|-id=483 bgcolor=#E9E9E9
| 276483 ||  || — || July 23, 2003 || Palomar || NEAT || ADE || align=right | 3.7 km || 
|-id=484 bgcolor=#E9E9E9
| 276484 ||  || — || July 25, 2003 || Socorro || LINEAR || — || align=right | 2.0 km || 
|-id=485 bgcolor=#fefefe
| 276485 ||  || — || July 31, 2003 || Reedy Creek || J. Broughton || FLO || align=right data-sort-value="0.87" | 870 m || 
|-id=486 bgcolor=#d6d6d6
| 276486 ||  || — || July 24, 2003 || Palomar || NEAT || — || align=right | 2.7 km || 
|-id=487 bgcolor=#E9E9E9
| 276487 ||  || — || July 24, 2003 || Palomar || NEAT || MIS || align=right | 3.1 km || 
|-id=488 bgcolor=#E9E9E9
| 276488 ||  || — || August 2, 2003 || Haleakala || NEAT || JUN || align=right | 1.6 km || 
|-id=489 bgcolor=#E9E9E9
| 276489 ||  || — || August 1, 2003 || Haleakala || NEAT || — || align=right | 2.1 km || 
|-id=490 bgcolor=#d6d6d6
| 276490 ||  || — || August 2, 2003 || Reedy Creek || J. Broughton || — || align=right | 5.3 km || 
|-id=491 bgcolor=#E9E9E9
| 276491 ||  || — || August 18, 2003 || Campo Imperatore || CINEOS || MIS || align=right | 3.2 km || 
|-id=492 bgcolor=#E9E9E9
| 276492 ||  || — || August 21, 2003 || Palomar || NEAT || — || align=right | 2.8 km || 
|-id=493 bgcolor=#d6d6d6
| 276493 ||  || — || August 21, 2003 || Campo Imperatore || CINEOS || — || align=right | 2.3 km || 
|-id=494 bgcolor=#E9E9E9
| 276494 ||  || — || August 22, 2003 || Palomar || NEAT || EUN || align=right | 1.7 km || 
|-id=495 bgcolor=#E9E9E9
| 276495 ||  || — || August 22, 2003 || Palomar || NEAT || — || align=right | 2.3 km || 
|-id=496 bgcolor=#d6d6d6
| 276496 ||  || — || August 23, 2003 || Kleť || Kleť Obs. || — || align=right | 3.5 km || 
|-id=497 bgcolor=#E9E9E9
| 276497 ||  || — || August 22, 2003 || Palomar || NEAT || WIT || align=right | 1.3 km || 
|-id=498 bgcolor=#E9E9E9
| 276498 ||  || — || August 24, 2003 || Socorro || LINEAR || HNA || align=right | 3.6 km || 
|-id=499 bgcolor=#E9E9E9
| 276499 ||  || — || August 23, 2003 || Palomar || NEAT || ADE || align=right | 2.8 km || 
|-id=500 bgcolor=#E9E9E9
| 276500 ||  || — || August 23, 2003 || Socorro || LINEAR || ADE || align=right | 3.1 km || 
|}

276501–276600 

|-bgcolor=#E9E9E9
| 276501 ||  || — || August 23, 2003 || Socorro || LINEAR || — || align=right | 2.6 km || 
|-id=502 bgcolor=#E9E9E9
| 276502 ||  || — || August 23, 2003 || Socorro || LINEAR || GEF || align=right | 1.6 km || 
|-id=503 bgcolor=#d6d6d6
| 276503 ||  || — || August 23, 2003 || Socorro || LINEAR || — || align=right | 4.9 km || 
|-id=504 bgcolor=#E9E9E9
| 276504 ||  || — || August 24, 2003 || Črni Vrh || Črni Vrh || — || align=right | 2.0 km || 
|-id=505 bgcolor=#E9E9E9
| 276505 ||  || — || August 25, 2003 || Socorro || LINEAR || — || align=right | 3.4 km || 
|-id=506 bgcolor=#E9E9E9
| 276506 ||  || — || August 23, 2003 || Palomar || NEAT || — || align=right | 3.0 km || 
|-id=507 bgcolor=#E9E9E9
| 276507 ||  || — || August 26, 2003 || Črni Vrh || H. Mikuž || WIT || align=right | 1.6 km || 
|-id=508 bgcolor=#E9E9E9
| 276508 ||  || — || August 24, 2003 || Socorro || LINEAR || 526 || align=right | 3.3 km || 
|-id=509 bgcolor=#E9E9E9
| 276509 ||  || — || August 25, 2003 || Socorro || LINEAR || XIZ || align=right | 1.9 km || 
|-id=510 bgcolor=#E9E9E9
| 276510 ||  || — || August 28, 2003 || Socorro || LINEAR || — || align=right | 4.5 km || 
|-id=511 bgcolor=#E9E9E9
| 276511 ||  || — || August 30, 2003 || Kitt Peak || Spacewatch || — || align=right | 2.5 km || 
|-id=512 bgcolor=#d6d6d6
| 276512 ||  || — || August 30, 2003 || Kitt Peak || Spacewatch || — || align=right | 2.7 km || 
|-id=513 bgcolor=#E9E9E9
| 276513 ||  || — || August 28, 2003 || Haleakala || NEAT || — || align=right | 2.9 km || 
|-id=514 bgcolor=#E9E9E9
| 276514 ||  || — || August 31, 2003 || Haleakala || NEAT || HNA || align=right | 3.5 km || 
|-id=515 bgcolor=#E9E9E9
| 276515 ||  || — || August 29, 2003 || Haleakala || NEAT || — || align=right | 4.1 km || 
|-id=516 bgcolor=#E9E9E9
| 276516 ||  || — || August 31, 2003 || Haleakala || NEAT || — || align=right | 2.4 km || 
|-id=517 bgcolor=#E9E9E9
| 276517 ||  || — || August 31, 2003 || Socorro || LINEAR || — || align=right | 3.2 km || 
|-id=518 bgcolor=#E9E9E9
| 276518 ||  || — || August 31, 2003 || Socorro || LINEAR || IAN || align=right | 1.4 km || 
|-id=519 bgcolor=#E9E9E9
| 276519 ||  || — || September 14, 2003 || Haleakala || NEAT || DOR || align=right | 3.7 km || 
|-id=520 bgcolor=#E9E9E9
| 276520 ||  || — || September 15, 2003 || Haleakala || NEAT || JUN || align=right | 1.8 km || 
|-id=521 bgcolor=#E9E9E9
| 276521 ||  || — || September 14, 2003 || Haleakala || NEAT || — || align=right | 3.4 km || 
|-id=522 bgcolor=#E9E9E9
| 276522 ||  || — || September 15, 2003 || Palomar || NEAT || CLO || align=right | 4.3 km || 
|-id=523 bgcolor=#d6d6d6
| 276523 ||  || — || September 15, 2003 || Anderson Mesa || LONEOS || EOS || align=right | 2.7 km || 
|-id=524 bgcolor=#E9E9E9
| 276524 ||  || — || September 15, 2003 || Anderson Mesa || LONEOS || — || align=right | 2.0 km || 
|-id=525 bgcolor=#E9E9E9
| 276525 ||  || — || September 15, 2003 || Palomar || NEAT || — || align=right | 3.5 km || 
|-id=526 bgcolor=#E9E9E9
| 276526 ||  || — || September 15, 2003 || Palomar || NEAT || — || align=right | 2.6 km || 
|-id=527 bgcolor=#E9E9E9
| 276527 ||  || — || September 15, 2003 || Palomar || NEAT || — || align=right | 4.0 km || 
|-id=528 bgcolor=#E9E9E9
| 276528 ||  || — || September 15, 2003 || Palomar || NEAT || — || align=right | 2.8 km || 
|-id=529 bgcolor=#d6d6d6
| 276529 ||  || — || September 16, 2003 || Kitt Peak || Spacewatch || KOR || align=right | 1.5 km || 
|-id=530 bgcolor=#E9E9E9
| 276530 ||  || — || September 16, 2003 || Kitt Peak || Spacewatch || — || align=right | 2.6 km || 
|-id=531 bgcolor=#d6d6d6
| 276531 ||  || — || September 18, 2003 || Kitt Peak || Spacewatch || 637 || align=right | 3.4 km || 
|-id=532 bgcolor=#E9E9E9
| 276532 ||  || — || September 18, 2003 || Palomar || NEAT || — || align=right | 3.6 km || 
|-id=533 bgcolor=#d6d6d6
| 276533 ||  || — || September 17, 2003 || Anderson Mesa || LONEOS || EMA || align=right | 5.1 km || 
|-id=534 bgcolor=#E9E9E9
| 276534 ||  || — || September 17, 2003 || Anderson Mesa || LONEOS || — || align=right | 3.0 km || 
|-id=535 bgcolor=#E9E9E9
| 276535 ||  || — || September 17, 2003 || Socorro || LINEAR || — || align=right | 3.7 km || 
|-id=536 bgcolor=#d6d6d6
| 276536 ||  || — || September 17, 2003 || Socorro || LINEAR || EMA || align=right | 4.7 km || 
|-id=537 bgcolor=#d6d6d6
| 276537 ||  || — || September 17, 2003 || Kitt Peak || Spacewatch || — || align=right | 4.1 km || 
|-id=538 bgcolor=#E9E9E9
| 276538 ||  || — || September 19, 2003 || Kitt Peak || Spacewatch || — || align=right | 2.8 km || 
|-id=539 bgcolor=#fefefe
| 276539 ||  || — || September 19, 2003 || Kitt Peak || Spacewatch || FLO || align=right data-sort-value="0.62" | 620 m || 
|-id=540 bgcolor=#E9E9E9
| 276540 ||  || — || September 19, 2003 || Haleakala || NEAT || — || align=right | 4.1 km || 
|-id=541 bgcolor=#d6d6d6
| 276541 ||  || — || September 19, 2003 || Kitt Peak || Spacewatch || — || align=right | 2.9 km || 
|-id=542 bgcolor=#d6d6d6
| 276542 ||  || — || September 18, 2003 || Palomar || NEAT || — || align=right | 3.8 km || 
|-id=543 bgcolor=#E9E9E9
| 276543 ||  || — || September 17, 2003 || Campo Imperatore || CINEOS || AGN || align=right | 1.7 km || 
|-id=544 bgcolor=#E9E9E9
| 276544 ||  || — || September 18, 2003 || Anderson Mesa || LONEOS || PAD || align=right | 2.7 km || 
|-id=545 bgcolor=#E9E9E9
| 276545 ||  || — || September 18, 2003 || Palomar || NEAT || — || align=right | 3.1 km || 
|-id=546 bgcolor=#d6d6d6
| 276546 ||  || — || September 20, 2003 || Desert Eagle || W. K. Y. Yeung || BRA || align=right | 1.9 km || 
|-id=547 bgcolor=#E9E9E9
| 276547 ||  || — || September 20, 2003 || Haleakala || NEAT || — || align=right | 4.4 km || 
|-id=548 bgcolor=#d6d6d6
| 276548 ||  || — || September 20, 2003 || Kitt Peak || Spacewatch || KOR || align=right | 1.4 km || 
|-id=549 bgcolor=#E9E9E9
| 276549 ||  || — || September 16, 2003 || Palomar || NEAT || — || align=right | 3.2 km || 
|-id=550 bgcolor=#d6d6d6
| 276550 ||  || — || September 19, 2003 || Kitt Peak || Spacewatch || — || align=right | 2.5 km || 
|-id=551 bgcolor=#E9E9E9
| 276551 ||  || — || September 18, 2003 || Kitt Peak || Spacewatch || — || align=right | 2.0 km || 
|-id=552 bgcolor=#d6d6d6
| 276552 ||  || — || September 19, 2003 || Kitt Peak || Spacewatch || 628 || align=right | 2.3 km || 
|-id=553 bgcolor=#E9E9E9
| 276553 ||  || — || September 19, 2003 || Campo Imperatore || CINEOS || AGN || align=right | 1.4 km || 
|-id=554 bgcolor=#d6d6d6
| 276554 ||  || — || September 20, 2003 || Palomar || NEAT || — || align=right | 3.9 km || 
|-id=555 bgcolor=#E9E9E9
| 276555 ||  || — || September 19, 2003 || Anderson Mesa || LONEOS || — || align=right | 4.0 km || 
|-id=556 bgcolor=#E9E9E9
| 276556 ||  || — || September 23, 2003 || Haleakala || NEAT || — || align=right | 2.5 km || 
|-id=557 bgcolor=#d6d6d6
| 276557 ||  || — || September 19, 2003 || Palomar || NEAT || HYG || align=right | 3.1 km || 
|-id=558 bgcolor=#E9E9E9
| 276558 ||  || — || September 19, 2003 || Kitt Peak || Spacewatch || — || align=right | 3.3 km || 
|-id=559 bgcolor=#E9E9E9
| 276559 ||  || — || September 22, 2003 || Anderson Mesa || LONEOS || — || align=right | 2.7 km || 
|-id=560 bgcolor=#E9E9E9
| 276560 ||  || — || September 19, 2003 || Palomar || NEAT || — || align=right | 4.8 km || 
|-id=561 bgcolor=#fefefe
| 276561 ||  || — || September 20, 2003 || Kitt Peak || Spacewatch || V || align=right | 1.5 km || 
|-id=562 bgcolor=#fefefe
| 276562 ||  || — || September 20, 2003 || Palomar || NEAT || — || align=right | 1.2 km || 
|-id=563 bgcolor=#d6d6d6
| 276563 ||  || — || September 21, 2003 || Anderson Mesa || LONEOS || — || align=right | 4.6 km || 
|-id=564 bgcolor=#d6d6d6
| 276564 ||  || — || September 22, 2003 || Anderson Mesa || LONEOS || — || align=right | 2.5 km || 
|-id=565 bgcolor=#E9E9E9
| 276565 ||  || — || September 22, 2003 || Anderson Mesa || LONEOS || — || align=right | 3.1 km || 
|-id=566 bgcolor=#d6d6d6
| 276566 ||  || — || September 26, 2003 || Socorro || LINEAR || — || align=right | 3.6 km || 
|-id=567 bgcolor=#E9E9E9
| 276567 ||  || — || September 25, 2003 || Haleakala || NEAT || — || align=right | 3.0 km || 
|-id=568 bgcolor=#d6d6d6
| 276568 Joestübler ||  ||  || September 27, 2003 || Linz || Davidschlag Obs. || — || align=right | 3.6 km || 
|-id=569 bgcolor=#d6d6d6
| 276569 ||  || — || September 28, 2003 || Desert Eagle || W. K. Y. Yeung || — || align=right | 3.5 km || 
|-id=570 bgcolor=#d6d6d6
| 276570 ||  || — || September 27, 2003 || Socorro || LINEAR || — || align=right | 4.6 km || 
|-id=571 bgcolor=#E9E9E9
| 276571 ||  || — || September 26, 2003 || Socorro || LINEAR || HEN || align=right | 1.7 km || 
|-id=572 bgcolor=#d6d6d6
| 276572 ||  || — || September 26, 2003 || Socorro || LINEAR || — || align=right | 3.8 km || 
|-id=573 bgcolor=#E9E9E9
| 276573 ||  || — || September 26, 2003 || Socorro || LINEAR || AGN || align=right | 1.7 km || 
|-id=574 bgcolor=#d6d6d6
| 276574 ||  || — || September 26, 2003 || Socorro || LINEAR || EOS || align=right | 2.7 km || 
|-id=575 bgcolor=#E9E9E9
| 276575 ||  || — || September 25, 2003 || Palomar || NEAT || ADE || align=right | 3.2 km || 
|-id=576 bgcolor=#d6d6d6
| 276576 ||  || — || September 17, 2003 || Kitt Peak || Spacewatch || — || align=right | 4.1 km || 
|-id=577 bgcolor=#E9E9E9
| 276577 ||  || — || September 19, 2003 || Kitt Peak || Spacewatch || — || align=right | 2.4 km || 
|-id=578 bgcolor=#d6d6d6
| 276578 ||  || — || September 20, 2003 || Campo Imperatore || CINEOS || EUP || align=right | 3.1 km || 
|-id=579 bgcolor=#E9E9E9
| 276579 ||  || — || September 28, 2003 || Desert Eagle || W. K. Y. Yeung || — || align=right | 3.0 km || 
|-id=580 bgcolor=#E9E9E9
| 276580 ||  || — || September 28, 2003 || Socorro || LINEAR || GEF || align=right | 1.9 km || 
|-id=581 bgcolor=#E9E9E9
| 276581 ||  || — || September 17, 2003 || Palomar || NEAT || — || align=right | 3.2 km || 
|-id=582 bgcolor=#d6d6d6
| 276582 ||  || — || September 27, 2003 || Socorro || LINEAR || — || align=right | 3.0 km || 
|-id=583 bgcolor=#d6d6d6
| 276583 ||  || — || September 30, 2003 || Kitt Peak || Spacewatch || — || align=right | 3.4 km || 
|-id=584 bgcolor=#E9E9E9
| 276584 ||  || — || September 16, 2003 || Kitt Peak || Spacewatch || AGN || align=right | 1.4 km || 
|-id=585 bgcolor=#d6d6d6
| 276585 ||  || — || September 16, 2003 || Kitt Peak || Spacewatch || — || align=right | 3.5 km || 
|-id=586 bgcolor=#d6d6d6
| 276586 ||  || — || September 17, 2003 || Kitt Peak || Spacewatch || KOR || align=right | 1.7 km || 
|-id=587 bgcolor=#fefefe
| 276587 ||  || — || September 18, 2003 || Kitt Peak || Spacewatch || — || align=right data-sort-value="0.75" | 750 m || 
|-id=588 bgcolor=#d6d6d6
| 276588 ||  || — || September 20, 2003 || Campo Imperatore || CINEOS || — || align=right | 3.0 km || 
|-id=589 bgcolor=#d6d6d6
| 276589 ||  || — || September 27, 2003 || Kitt Peak || Spacewatch || — || align=right | 2.8 km || 
|-id=590 bgcolor=#d6d6d6
| 276590 ||  || — || September 26, 2003 || Apache Point || SDSS || — || align=right | 4.1 km || 
|-id=591 bgcolor=#E9E9E9
| 276591 ||  || — || September 26, 2003 || Apache Point || SDSS || AGN || align=right | 1.2 km || 
|-id=592 bgcolor=#d6d6d6
| 276592 ||  || — || September 26, 2003 || Apache Point || SDSS || — || align=right | 3.4 km || 
|-id=593 bgcolor=#d6d6d6
| 276593 ||  || — || September 26, 2003 || Apache Point || SDSS || — || align=right | 2.8 km || 
|-id=594 bgcolor=#E9E9E9
| 276594 ||  || — || September 26, 2003 || Apache Point || SDSS || — || align=right | 2.4 km || 
|-id=595 bgcolor=#E9E9E9
| 276595 ||  || — || September 26, 2003 || Apache Point || SDSS || — || align=right | 2.6 km || 
|-id=596 bgcolor=#d6d6d6
| 276596 ||  || — || September 27, 2003 || Apache Point || SDSS || URS || align=right | 4.6 km || 
|-id=597 bgcolor=#d6d6d6
| 276597 ||  || — || September 30, 2003 || Kitt Peak || Spacewatch || EOS || align=right | 2.2 km || 
|-id=598 bgcolor=#E9E9E9
| 276598 ||  || — || October 15, 2003 || Anderson Mesa || LONEOS || — || align=right | 3.4 km || 
|-id=599 bgcolor=#d6d6d6
| 276599 ||  || — || October 1, 2003 || Kitt Peak || Spacewatch || EUP || align=right | 4.0 km || 
|-id=600 bgcolor=#d6d6d6
| 276600 ||  || — || October 3, 2003 || Kitt Peak || Spacewatch || — || align=right | 2.3 km || 
|}

276601–276700 

|-bgcolor=#d6d6d6
| 276601 ||  || — || October 5, 2003 || Kitt Peak || Spacewatch || NAE || align=right | 2.3 km || 
|-id=602 bgcolor=#E9E9E9
| 276602 ||  || — || October 5, 2003 || Kitt Peak || Spacewatch || — || align=right | 2.7 km || 
|-id=603 bgcolor=#fefefe
| 276603 ||  || — || October 14, 2003 || Anderson Mesa || LONEOS || — || align=right | 1.2 km || 
|-id=604 bgcolor=#E9E9E9
| 276604 ||  || — || October 16, 2003 || Anderson Mesa || LONEOS || — || align=right | 2.2 km || 
|-id=605 bgcolor=#d6d6d6
| 276605 ||  || — || October 16, 2003 || Kitt Peak || Spacewatch || CHA || align=right | 2.7 km || 
|-id=606 bgcolor=#d6d6d6
| 276606 ||  || — || October 17, 2003 || Kitt Peak || Spacewatch || THM || align=right | 2.1 km || 
|-id=607 bgcolor=#d6d6d6
| 276607 ||  || — || October 18, 2003 || Palomar || NEAT || — || align=right | 4.4 km || 
|-id=608 bgcolor=#d6d6d6
| 276608 ||  || — || October 16, 2003 || Kitt Peak || Spacewatch || KOR || align=right | 1.5 km || 
|-id=609 bgcolor=#d6d6d6
| 276609 ||  || — || October 18, 2003 || Kitt Peak || Spacewatch || KOR || align=right | 1.5 km || 
|-id=610 bgcolor=#d6d6d6
| 276610 ||  || — || October 18, 2003 || Kitt Peak || Spacewatch || CHA || align=right | 2.5 km || 
|-id=611 bgcolor=#d6d6d6
| 276611 ||  || — || October 19, 2003 || Kitt Peak || Spacewatch || EUP || align=right | 3.0 km || 
|-id=612 bgcolor=#d6d6d6
| 276612 ||  || — || October 17, 2003 || Anderson Mesa || LONEOS || — || align=right | 4.3 km || 
|-id=613 bgcolor=#d6d6d6
| 276613 ||  || — || October 18, 2003 || Palomar || NEAT || — || align=right | 4.8 km || 
|-id=614 bgcolor=#d6d6d6
| 276614 ||  || — || October 20, 2003 || Socorro || LINEAR || EOS || align=right | 2.6 km || 
|-id=615 bgcolor=#d6d6d6
| 276615 ||  || — || October 20, 2003 || Palomar || NEAT || — || align=right | 3.4 km || 
|-id=616 bgcolor=#E9E9E9
| 276616 ||  || — || October 19, 2003 || Anderson Mesa || LONEOS || — || align=right | 2.9 km || 
|-id=617 bgcolor=#E9E9E9
| 276617 ||  || — || October 20, 2003 || Palomar || NEAT || DOR || align=right | 3.0 km || 
|-id=618 bgcolor=#fefefe
| 276618 ||  || — || October 20, 2003 || Socorro || LINEAR || V || align=right data-sort-value="0.93" | 930 m || 
|-id=619 bgcolor=#d6d6d6
| 276619 ||  || — || October 20, 2003 || Socorro || LINEAR || — || align=right | 3.8 km || 
|-id=620 bgcolor=#FA8072
| 276620 ||  || — || October 21, 2003 || Socorro || LINEAR || — || align=right data-sort-value="0.72" | 720 m || 
|-id=621 bgcolor=#d6d6d6
| 276621 ||  || — || October 20, 2003 || Socorro || LINEAR || — || align=right | 4.4 km || 
|-id=622 bgcolor=#E9E9E9
| 276622 ||  || — || October 21, 2003 || Anderson Mesa || LONEOS || — || align=right | 3.2 km || 
|-id=623 bgcolor=#fefefe
| 276623 ||  || — || October 21, 2003 || Palomar || NEAT || — || align=right data-sort-value="0.80" | 800 m || 
|-id=624 bgcolor=#E9E9E9
| 276624 ||  || — || October 16, 2003 || Anderson Mesa || LONEOS || — || align=right | 3.1 km || 
|-id=625 bgcolor=#E9E9E9
| 276625 ||  || — || October 18, 2003 || Anderson Mesa || LONEOS || CLO || align=right | 3.4 km || 
|-id=626 bgcolor=#d6d6d6
| 276626 ||  || — || October 19, 2003 || Anderson Mesa || LONEOS || — || align=right | 5.9 km || 
|-id=627 bgcolor=#E9E9E9
| 276627 ||  || — || October 20, 2003 || Kitt Peak || Spacewatch || — || align=right | 3.4 km || 
|-id=628 bgcolor=#E9E9E9
| 276628 ||  || — || October 21, 2003 || Socorro || LINEAR || — || align=right | 3.5 km || 
|-id=629 bgcolor=#d6d6d6
| 276629 ||  || — || October 20, 2003 || Kitt Peak || Spacewatch || — || align=right | 2.9 km || 
|-id=630 bgcolor=#d6d6d6
| 276630 ||  || — || October 20, 2003 || Socorro || LINEAR || — || align=right | 3.6 km || 
|-id=631 bgcolor=#d6d6d6
| 276631 ||  || — || October 20, 2003 || Kitt Peak || Spacewatch || — || align=right | 6.4 km || 
|-id=632 bgcolor=#d6d6d6
| 276632 ||  || — || October 21, 2003 || Kitt Peak || Spacewatch || EOS || align=right | 2.7 km || 
|-id=633 bgcolor=#fefefe
| 276633 ||  || — || October 21, 2003 || Socorro || LINEAR || FLO || align=right data-sort-value="0.90" | 900 m || 
|-id=634 bgcolor=#d6d6d6
| 276634 ||  || — || October 21, 2003 || Kitt Peak || Spacewatch || EUP || align=right | 6.2 km || 
|-id=635 bgcolor=#fefefe
| 276635 ||  || — || October 21, 2003 || Socorro || LINEAR || FLO || align=right | 1.0 km || 
|-id=636 bgcolor=#fefefe
| 276636 ||  || — || October 21, 2003 || Socorro || LINEAR || — || align=right | 1.0 km || 
|-id=637 bgcolor=#d6d6d6
| 276637 ||  || — || October 22, 2003 || Kitt Peak || Spacewatch || — || align=right | 4.0 km || 
|-id=638 bgcolor=#d6d6d6
| 276638 ||  || — || October 22, 2003 || Kitt Peak || Spacewatch || THM || align=right | 2.4 km || 
|-id=639 bgcolor=#fefefe
| 276639 ||  || — || October 23, 2003 || Kitt Peak || Spacewatch || FLO || align=right data-sort-value="0.69" | 690 m || 
|-id=640 bgcolor=#d6d6d6
| 276640 ||  || — || October 23, 2003 || Kitt Peak || Spacewatch || — || align=right | 2.9 km || 
|-id=641 bgcolor=#d6d6d6
| 276641 ||  || — || October 24, 2003 || Socorro || LINEAR || — || align=right | 2.7 km || 
|-id=642 bgcolor=#d6d6d6
| 276642 ||  || — || October 22, 2003 || Kitt Peak || Spacewatch || TRE || align=right | 4.8 km || 
|-id=643 bgcolor=#E9E9E9
| 276643 ||  || — || October 22, 2003 || Socorro || LINEAR || — || align=right | 2.9 km || 
|-id=644 bgcolor=#d6d6d6
| 276644 ||  || — || October 23, 2003 || Kitt Peak || Spacewatch || EOS || align=right | 2.4 km || 
|-id=645 bgcolor=#fefefe
| 276645 ||  || — || October 24, 2003 || Socorro || LINEAR || V || align=right data-sort-value="0.83" | 830 m || 
|-id=646 bgcolor=#d6d6d6
| 276646 ||  || — || October 27, 2003 || Socorro || LINEAR || ALA || align=right | 7.0 km || 
|-id=647 bgcolor=#d6d6d6
| 276647 ||  || — || October 24, 2003 || Kitt Peak || Spacewatch || — || align=right | 3.0 km || 
|-id=648 bgcolor=#d6d6d6
| 276648 ||  || — || October 24, 2003 || Kitt Peak || Spacewatch || TRE || align=right | 2.5 km || 
|-id=649 bgcolor=#fefefe
| 276649 ||  || — || October 27, 2003 || Socorro || LINEAR || V || align=right data-sort-value="0.83" | 830 m || 
|-id=650 bgcolor=#E9E9E9
| 276650 ||  || — || October 28, 2003 || Socorro || LINEAR || — || align=right | 2.9 km || 
|-id=651 bgcolor=#d6d6d6
| 276651 ||  || — || October 28, 2003 || Socorro || LINEAR || — || align=right | 5.9 km || 
|-id=652 bgcolor=#d6d6d6
| 276652 ||  || — || October 29, 2003 || Kitt Peak || Spacewatch || — || align=right | 4.0 km || 
|-id=653 bgcolor=#d6d6d6
| 276653 ||  || — || October 19, 2003 || Kitt Peak || Spacewatch || KOR || align=right | 2.2 km || 
|-id=654 bgcolor=#E9E9E9
| 276654 ||  || — || October 17, 2003 || Apache Point || SDSS || MAR || align=right | 1.5 km || 
|-id=655 bgcolor=#d6d6d6
| 276655 ||  || — || October 21, 2003 || Kitt Peak || Spacewatch || — || align=right | 2.4 km || 
|-id=656 bgcolor=#d6d6d6
| 276656 ||  || — || November 15, 2003 || Kitt Peak || Spacewatch || — || align=right | 2.5 km || 
|-id=657 bgcolor=#fefefe
| 276657 ||  || — || November 15, 2003 || Kitt Peak || Spacewatch || MAS || align=right data-sort-value="0.85" | 850 m || 
|-id=658 bgcolor=#d6d6d6
| 276658 ||  || — || November 1, 2003 || Socorro || LINEAR || 629 || align=right | 1.9 km || 
|-id=659 bgcolor=#d6d6d6
| 276659 ||  || — || November 16, 2003 || Kitt Peak || Spacewatch || — || align=right | 3.7 km || 
|-id=660 bgcolor=#FFC2E0
| 276660 ||  || — || November 21, 2003 || Socorro || LINEAR || AMO || align=right data-sort-value="0.78" | 780 m || 
|-id=661 bgcolor=#fefefe
| 276661 ||  || — || November 19, 2003 || Kitt Peak || Spacewatch || — || align=right data-sort-value="0.77" | 770 m || 
|-id=662 bgcolor=#d6d6d6
| 276662 ||  || — || November 20, 2003 || Socorro || LINEAR || — || align=right | 3.8 km || 
|-id=663 bgcolor=#fefefe
| 276663 ||  || — || November 18, 2003 || Kitt Peak || Spacewatch || NYS || align=right data-sort-value="0.96" | 960 m || 
|-id=664 bgcolor=#d6d6d6
| 276664 ||  || — || November 18, 2003 || Kitt Peak || Spacewatch || — || align=right | 3.7 km || 
|-id=665 bgcolor=#d6d6d6
| 276665 ||  || — || November 19, 2003 || Kitt Peak || Spacewatch || EUP || align=right | 3.6 km || 
|-id=666 bgcolor=#E9E9E9
| 276666 ||  || — || November 20, 2003 || Socorro || LINEAR || — || align=right | 3.9 km || 
|-id=667 bgcolor=#d6d6d6
| 276667 ||  || — || November 19, 2003 || Socorro || LINEAR || VER || align=right | 3.5 km || 
|-id=668 bgcolor=#d6d6d6
| 276668 ||  || — || November 20, 2003 || Socorro || LINEAR || EOS || align=right | 2.7 km || 
|-id=669 bgcolor=#d6d6d6
| 276669 ||  || — || November 26, 2003 || Kitt Peak || Spacewatch || — || align=right | 3.6 km || 
|-id=670 bgcolor=#E9E9E9
| 276670 ||  || — || November 29, 2003 || Socorro || LINEAR || — || align=right | 5.0 km || 
|-id=671 bgcolor=#fefefe
| 276671 ||  || — || November 22, 2003 || Socorro || LINEAR || PHO || align=right | 1.7 km || 
|-id=672 bgcolor=#d6d6d6
| 276672 ||  || — || November 20, 2003 || Kitt Peak || M. W. Buie || — || align=right | 3.2 km || 
|-id=673 bgcolor=#d6d6d6
| 276673 ||  || — || November 23, 2003 || Kitt Peak || M. W. Buie || — || align=right | 2.2 km || 
|-id=674 bgcolor=#d6d6d6
| 276674 ||  || — || November 21, 2003 || Catalina || CSS || — || align=right | 4.5 km || 
|-id=675 bgcolor=#fefefe
| 276675 ||  || — || November 20, 2003 || Socorro || LINEAR || — || align=right | 1.1 km || 
|-id=676 bgcolor=#d6d6d6
| 276676 ||  || — || November 19, 2003 || Anderson Mesa || LONEOS || EMA || align=right | 5.0 km || 
|-id=677 bgcolor=#fefefe
| 276677 ||  || — || November 20, 2003 || Socorro || LINEAR || — || align=right data-sort-value="0.98" | 980 m || 
|-id=678 bgcolor=#d6d6d6
| 276678 ||  || — || December 1, 2003 || Socorro || LINEAR || EOS || align=right | 3.2 km || 
|-id=679 bgcolor=#d6d6d6
| 276679 ||  || — || December 15, 2003 || Socorro || LINEAR || THB || align=right | 3.7 km || 
|-id=680 bgcolor=#d6d6d6
| 276680 ||  || — || December 1, 2003 || Kitt Peak || Spacewatch || — || align=right | 3.5 km || 
|-id=681 bgcolor=#fefefe
| 276681 Loremaes ||  ||  || December 18, 2003 || Uccle || T. Pauwels, P. De Cat || — || align=right | 1.2 km || 
|-id=682 bgcolor=#fefefe
| 276682 ||  || — || December 18, 2003 || Socorro || LINEAR || NYS || align=right | 1.1 km || 
|-id=683 bgcolor=#d6d6d6
| 276683 ||  || — || December 18, 2003 || Socorro || LINEAR || — || align=right | 4.3 km || 
|-id=684 bgcolor=#fefefe
| 276684 ||  || — || December 17, 2003 || Kitt Peak || Spacewatch || FLO || align=right data-sort-value="0.71" | 710 m || 
|-id=685 bgcolor=#d6d6d6
| 276685 ||  || — || December 19, 2003 || Kitt Peak || Spacewatch || — || align=right | 4.1 km || 
|-id=686 bgcolor=#fefefe
| 276686 ||  || — || December 19, 2003 || Kitt Peak || Spacewatch || — || align=right data-sort-value="0.75" | 750 m || 
|-id=687 bgcolor=#d6d6d6
| 276687 ||  || — || December 17, 2003 || Socorro || LINEAR || — || align=right | 6.0 km || 
|-id=688 bgcolor=#fefefe
| 276688 ||  || — || December 19, 2003 || Socorro || LINEAR || — || align=right | 1.3 km || 
|-id=689 bgcolor=#fefefe
| 276689 ||  || — || December 19, 2003 || Kitt Peak || Spacewatch || — || align=right data-sort-value="0.94" | 940 m || 
|-id=690 bgcolor=#d6d6d6
| 276690 ||  || — || December 21, 2003 || Kitt Peak || Spacewatch || — || align=right | 5.7 km || 
|-id=691 bgcolor=#d6d6d6
| 276691 ||  || — || December 25, 2003 || Piszkéstető || K. Sárneczky || — || align=right | 5.3 km || 
|-id=692 bgcolor=#d6d6d6
| 276692 ||  || — || December 23, 2003 || Socorro || LINEAR || — || align=right | 5.6 km || 
|-id=693 bgcolor=#d6d6d6
| 276693 ||  || — || December 27, 2003 || Socorro || LINEAR || EUP || align=right | 5.2 km || 
|-id=694 bgcolor=#d6d6d6
| 276694 ||  || — || December 27, 2003 || Socorro || LINEAR || THB || align=right | 4.8 km || 
|-id=695 bgcolor=#d6d6d6
| 276695 ||  || — || December 27, 2003 || Socorro || LINEAR || — || align=right | 4.6 km || 
|-id=696 bgcolor=#d6d6d6
| 276696 ||  || — || December 28, 2003 || Socorro || LINEAR || — || align=right | 5.9 km || 
|-id=697 bgcolor=#d6d6d6
| 276697 ||  || — || December 29, 2003 || Socorro || LINEAR || EOS || align=right | 3.1 km || 
|-id=698 bgcolor=#fefefe
| 276698 ||  || — || January 15, 2004 || Kitt Peak || Spacewatch || — || align=right data-sort-value="0.91" | 910 m || 
|-id=699 bgcolor=#E9E9E9
| 276699 ||  || — || January 14, 2004 || Palomar || NEAT || — || align=right | 2.1 km || 
|-id=700 bgcolor=#d6d6d6
| 276700 ||  || — || January 15, 2004 || Kitt Peak || Spacewatch || CRO || align=right | 3.3 km || 
|}

276701–276800 

|-bgcolor=#d6d6d6
| 276701 ||  || — || January 16, 2004 || Kitt Peak || Spacewatch || — || align=right | 4.4 km || 
|-id=702 bgcolor=#d6d6d6
| 276702 ||  || — || January 16, 2004 || Palomar || NEAT || — || align=right | 4.4 km || 
|-id=703 bgcolor=#FFC2E0
| 276703 ||  || — || January 18, 2004 || Kitt Peak || Spacewatch || APO || align=right data-sort-value="0.52" | 520 m || 
|-id=704 bgcolor=#fefefe
| 276704 ||  || — || January 17, 2004 || Palomar || NEAT || — || align=right | 1.2 km || 
|-id=705 bgcolor=#d6d6d6
| 276705 ||  || — || January 18, 2004 || Kitt Peak || Spacewatch || EOS || align=right | 2.5 km || 
|-id=706 bgcolor=#d6d6d6
| 276706 ||  || — || January 18, 2004 || Palomar || NEAT || — || align=right | 4.7 km || 
|-id=707 bgcolor=#d6d6d6
| 276707 ||  || — || January 19, 2004 || Kitt Peak || Spacewatch || — || align=right | 3.6 km || 
|-id=708 bgcolor=#d6d6d6
| 276708 ||  || — || January 19, 2004 || Kitt Peak || Spacewatch || — || align=right | 3.7 km || 
|-id=709 bgcolor=#d6d6d6
| 276709 ||  || — || January 19, 2004 || Kitt Peak || Spacewatch || — || align=right | 3.7 km || 
|-id=710 bgcolor=#fefefe
| 276710 ||  || — || January 19, 2004 || Kitt Peak || Spacewatch || — || align=right data-sort-value="0.86" | 860 m || 
|-id=711 bgcolor=#fefefe
| 276711 ||  || — || January 21, 2004 || Socorro || LINEAR || V || align=right data-sort-value="0.86" | 860 m || 
|-id=712 bgcolor=#fefefe
| 276712 ||  || — || January 22, 2004 || Socorro || LINEAR || — || align=right | 1.1 km || 
|-id=713 bgcolor=#fefefe
| 276713 ||  || — || January 24, 2004 || Socorro || LINEAR || — || align=right data-sort-value="0.86" | 860 m || 
|-id=714 bgcolor=#fefefe
| 276714 ||  || — || January 27, 2004 || Socorro || LINEAR || FLO || align=right data-sort-value="0.83" | 830 m || 
|-id=715 bgcolor=#d6d6d6
| 276715 ||  || — || January 16, 2004 || Kitt Peak || Spacewatch || EOS || align=right | 2.2 km || 
|-id=716 bgcolor=#d6d6d6
| 276716 ||  || — || January 19, 2004 || Socorro || LINEAR || MEL || align=right | 4.2 km || 
|-id=717 bgcolor=#fefefe
| 276717 ||  || — || February 11, 2004 || Anderson Mesa || LONEOS || — || align=right | 1.2 km || 
|-id=718 bgcolor=#fefefe
| 276718 ||  || — || February 10, 2004 || Palomar || NEAT || FLO || align=right data-sort-value="0.77" | 770 m || 
|-id=719 bgcolor=#d6d6d6
| 276719 ||  || — || February 11, 2004 || Kitt Peak || Spacewatch || — || align=right | 4.4 km || 
|-id=720 bgcolor=#d6d6d6
| 276720 ||  || — || February 11, 2004 || Kitt Peak || Spacewatch || — || align=right | 4.5 km || 
|-id=721 bgcolor=#fefefe
| 276721 ||  || — || February 11, 2004 || Palomar || NEAT || FLO || align=right data-sort-value="0.69" | 690 m || 
|-id=722 bgcolor=#fefefe
| 276722 ||  || — || February 12, 2004 || Kitt Peak || Spacewatch || — || align=right data-sort-value="0.71" | 710 m || 
|-id=723 bgcolor=#fefefe
| 276723 ||  || — || February 13, 2004 || Kitt Peak || Spacewatch || FLO || align=right data-sort-value="0.89" | 890 m || 
|-id=724 bgcolor=#fefefe
| 276724 ||  || — || February 14, 2004 || Haleakala || NEAT || — || align=right | 1.4 km || 
|-id=725 bgcolor=#fefefe
| 276725 ||  || — || February 13, 2004 || Palomar || NEAT || FLO || align=right | 1.1 km || 
|-id=726 bgcolor=#fefefe
| 276726 ||  || — || February 15, 2004 || Catalina || CSS || — || align=right | 1.3 km || 
|-id=727 bgcolor=#fefefe
| 276727 ||  || — || February 13, 2004 || Palomar || NEAT || — || align=right | 1.2 km || 
|-id=728 bgcolor=#fefefe
| 276728 ||  || — || February 11, 2004 || Palomar || NEAT || — || align=right data-sort-value="0.99" | 990 m || 
|-id=729 bgcolor=#fefefe
| 276729 ||  || — || February 19, 2004 || Socorro || LINEAR || — || align=right data-sort-value="0.89" | 890 m || 
|-id=730 bgcolor=#fefefe
| 276730 ||  || — || February 19, 2004 || Socorro || LINEAR || — || align=right | 1.0 km || 
|-id=731 bgcolor=#fefefe
| 276731 ||  || — || March 12, 2004 || Palomar || NEAT || — || align=right data-sort-value="0.81" | 810 m || 
|-id=732 bgcolor=#FFC2E0
| 276732 ||  || — || March 15, 2004 || Socorro || LINEAR || APO +1km || align=right | 1.0 km || 
|-id=733 bgcolor=#fefefe
| 276733 ||  || — || January 30, 2004 || Kitt Peak || Spacewatch || — || align=right | 1.2 km || 
|-id=734 bgcolor=#fefefe
| 276734 ||  || — || March 11, 2004 || Palomar || NEAT || FLO || align=right data-sort-value="0.89" | 890 m || 
|-id=735 bgcolor=#fefefe
| 276735 ||  || — || March 11, 2004 || Palomar || NEAT || FLO || align=right data-sort-value="0.96" | 960 m || 
|-id=736 bgcolor=#fefefe
| 276736 ||  || — || March 12, 2004 || Palomar || NEAT || — || align=right data-sort-value="0.93" | 930 m || 
|-id=737 bgcolor=#fefefe
| 276737 ||  || — || March 14, 2004 || Catalina || CSS || NYS || align=right data-sort-value="0.94" | 940 m || 
|-id=738 bgcolor=#fefefe
| 276738 ||  || — || March 15, 2004 || Catalina || CSS || — || align=right | 1.1 km || 
|-id=739 bgcolor=#fefefe
| 276739 ||  || — || March 15, 2004 || Socorro || LINEAR || FLO || align=right data-sort-value="0.64" | 640 m || 
|-id=740 bgcolor=#fefefe
| 276740 ||  || — || March 14, 2004 || Kitt Peak || Spacewatch || — || align=right | 1.1 km || 
|-id=741 bgcolor=#FA8072
| 276741 ||  || — || March 14, 2004 || Socorro || LINEAR || — || align=right | 1.5 km || 
|-id=742 bgcolor=#fefefe
| 276742 ||  || — || March 14, 2004 || Kitt Peak || Spacewatch || FLO || align=right | 1.4 km || 
|-id=743 bgcolor=#fefefe
| 276743 ||  || — || March 15, 2004 || Kitt Peak || Spacewatch || V || align=right data-sort-value="0.65" | 650 m || 
|-id=744 bgcolor=#fefefe
| 276744 ||  || — || March 28, 2004 || Desert Eagle || W. K. Y. Yeung || FLO || align=right data-sort-value="0.61" | 610 m || 
|-id=745 bgcolor=#fefefe
| 276745 ||  || — || March 17, 2004 || Kitt Peak || Spacewatch || V || align=right data-sort-value="0.70" | 700 m || 
|-id=746 bgcolor=#fefefe
| 276746 ||  || — || March 17, 2004 || Kitt Peak || Spacewatch || — || align=right | 1.1 km || 
|-id=747 bgcolor=#fefefe
| 276747 ||  || — || March 29, 2004 || Socorro || LINEAR || — || align=right | 1.3 km || 
|-id=748 bgcolor=#fefefe
| 276748 ||  || — || March 16, 2004 || Catalina || CSS || PHO || align=right | 2.7 km || 
|-id=749 bgcolor=#fefefe
| 276749 ||  || — || March 20, 2004 || Socorro || LINEAR || V || align=right data-sort-value="0.73" | 730 m || 
|-id=750 bgcolor=#fefefe
| 276750 ||  || — || March 19, 2004 || Palomar || NEAT || — || align=right data-sort-value="0.75" | 750 m || 
|-id=751 bgcolor=#fefefe
| 276751 ||  || — || March 20, 2004 || Socorro || LINEAR || — || align=right data-sort-value="0.70" | 700 m || 
|-id=752 bgcolor=#fefefe
| 276752 ||  || — || March 23, 2004 || Socorro || LINEAR || V || align=right data-sort-value="0.84" | 840 m || 
|-id=753 bgcolor=#fefefe
| 276753 ||  || — || March 25, 2004 || Anderson Mesa || LONEOS || — || align=right | 1.1 km || 
|-id=754 bgcolor=#E9E9E9
| 276754 ||  || — || March 19, 2004 || Palomar || NEAT || EUN || align=right | 1.8 km || 
|-id=755 bgcolor=#fefefe
| 276755 ||  || — || March 27, 2004 || Socorro || LINEAR || — || align=right data-sort-value="0.89" | 890 m || 
|-id=756 bgcolor=#fefefe
| 276756 ||  || — || March 17, 2004 || Socorro || LINEAR || — || align=right | 1.0 km || 
|-id=757 bgcolor=#d6d6d6
| 276757 ||  || — || March 30, 2004 || Kitt Peak || Spacewatch || — || align=right | 5.0 km || 
|-id=758 bgcolor=#fefefe
| 276758 ||  || — || March 29, 2004 || Socorro || LINEAR || PHO || align=right | 1.4 km || 
|-id=759 bgcolor=#fefefe
| 276759 ||  || — || March 18, 2004 || Kitt Peak || Spacewatch || — || align=right data-sort-value="0.89" | 890 m || 
|-id=760 bgcolor=#fefefe
| 276760 ||  || — || April 10, 2004 || Kvistaberg || UDAS || — || align=right | 1.0 km || 
|-id=761 bgcolor=#fefefe
| 276761 ||  || — || April 12, 2004 || Catalina || CSS || — || align=right | 1.3 km || 
|-id=762 bgcolor=#fefefe
| 276762 ||  || — || April 12, 2004 || Kitt Peak || Spacewatch || NYS || align=right data-sort-value="0.81" | 810 m || 
|-id=763 bgcolor=#fefefe
| 276763 ||  || — || April 14, 2004 || Kitt Peak || Spacewatch || V || align=right | 1.1 km || 
|-id=764 bgcolor=#fefefe
| 276764 ||  || — || April 14, 2004 || Kitt Peak || Spacewatch || FLO || align=right data-sort-value="0.81" | 810 m || 
|-id=765 bgcolor=#fefefe
| 276765 ||  || — || April 12, 2004 || Kitt Peak || Spacewatch || — || align=right | 1.7 km || 
|-id=766 bgcolor=#fefefe
| 276766 ||  || — || April 14, 2004 || Kitt Peak || Spacewatch || — || align=right | 1.0 km || 
|-id=767 bgcolor=#fefefe
| 276767 ||  || — || April 13, 2004 || Kitt Peak || Spacewatch || V || align=right | 1.0 km || 
|-id=768 bgcolor=#d6d6d6
| 276768 ||  || — || April 14, 2004 || Kitt Peak || Spacewatch || — || align=right | 2.0 km || 
|-id=769 bgcolor=#fefefe
| 276769 ||  || — || April 15, 2004 || Socorro || LINEAR || PHO || align=right | 1.3 km || 
|-id=770 bgcolor=#FFC2E0
| 276770 ||  || — || April 16, 2004 || Socorro || LINEAR || ATEcritical || align=right data-sort-value="0.37" | 370 m || 
|-id=771 bgcolor=#fefefe
| 276771 ||  || — || April 17, 2004 || Palomar || NEAT || — || align=right | 1.4 km || 
|-id=772 bgcolor=#fefefe
| 276772 ||  || — || April 20, 2004 || Socorro || LINEAR || FLO || align=right data-sort-value="0.95" | 950 m || 
|-id=773 bgcolor=#fefefe
| 276773 ||  || — || April 19, 2004 || Kitt Peak || Spacewatch || FLO || align=right data-sort-value="0.68" | 680 m || 
|-id=774 bgcolor=#fefefe
| 276774 ||  || — || April 23, 2004 || Socorro || LINEAR || — || align=right data-sort-value="0.96" | 960 m || 
|-id=775 bgcolor=#fefefe
| 276775 ||  || — || April 22, 2004 || Siding Spring || SSS || — || align=right | 1.2 km || 
|-id=776 bgcolor=#fefefe
| 276776 ||  || — || April 23, 2004 || Socorro || LINEAR || — || align=right | 1.1 km || 
|-id=777 bgcolor=#fefefe
| 276777 ||  || — || April 22, 2004 || Socorro || LINEAR || NYS || align=right data-sort-value="0.90" | 900 m || 
|-id=778 bgcolor=#fefefe
| 276778 ||  || — || April 16, 2004 || Palomar || NEAT || NYS || align=right data-sort-value="0.70" | 700 m || 
|-id=779 bgcolor=#fefefe
| 276779 ||  || — || May 8, 2004 || Palomar || NEAT || — || align=right | 1.0 km || 
|-id=780 bgcolor=#fefefe
| 276780 ||  || — || May 9, 2004 || Kitt Peak || Spacewatch || FLO || align=right data-sort-value="0.77" | 770 m || 
|-id=781 bgcolor=#fefefe
| 276781 Montchaibeux ||  ||  || May 11, 2004 || Vicques || M. Ory || V || align=right data-sort-value="0.83" | 830 m || 
|-id=782 bgcolor=#fefefe
| 276782 ||  || — || May 11, 2004 || Anderson Mesa || LONEOS || ERI || align=right | 1.8 km || 
|-id=783 bgcolor=#fefefe
| 276783 ||  || — || May 15, 2004 || Socorro || LINEAR || V || align=right data-sort-value="0.78" | 780 m || 
|-id=784 bgcolor=#fefefe
| 276784 ||  || — || May 15, 2004 || Socorro || LINEAR || — || align=right | 1.2 km || 
|-id=785 bgcolor=#FA8072
| 276785 ||  || — || May 19, 2004 || Kitt Peak || Spacewatch || — || align=right data-sort-value="0.64" | 640 m || 
|-id=786 bgcolor=#FFC2E0
| 276786 ||  || — || May 18, 2004 || Catalina || CSS || AMO +1km || align=right | 1.7 km || 
|-id=787 bgcolor=#fefefe
| 276787 ||  || — || May 17, 2004 || Socorro || LINEAR || — || align=right | 1.2 km || 
|-id=788 bgcolor=#d6d6d6
| 276788 ||  || — || May 20, 2004 || Siding Spring || SSS || — || align=right | 4.0 km || 
|-id=789 bgcolor=#E9E9E9
| 276789 ||  || — || June 15, 2004 || Socorro || LINEAR || — || align=right | 1.8 km || 
|-id=790 bgcolor=#fefefe
| 276790 ||  || — || July 11, 2004 || Socorro || LINEAR || — || align=right | 1.2 km || 
|-id=791 bgcolor=#E9E9E9
| 276791 ||  || — || July 11, 2004 || Socorro || LINEAR || — || align=right | 1.9 km || 
|-id=792 bgcolor=#fefefe
| 276792 ||  || — || July 11, 2004 || Socorro || LINEAR || NYS || align=right data-sort-value="0.88" | 880 m || 
|-id=793 bgcolor=#fefefe
| 276793 ||  || — || July 11, 2004 || Socorro || LINEAR || NYS || align=right | 1.0 km || 
|-id=794 bgcolor=#fefefe
| 276794 ||  || — || July 11, 2004 || Socorro || LINEAR || — || align=right | 4.4 km || 
|-id=795 bgcolor=#fefefe
| 276795 ||  || — || July 9, 2004 || Anderson Mesa || LONEOS || — || align=right | 1.1 km || 
|-id=796 bgcolor=#fefefe
| 276796 ||  || — || July 9, 2004 || Anderson Mesa || LONEOS || — || align=right | 1.5 km || 
|-id=797 bgcolor=#fefefe
| 276797 ||  || — || July 18, 2004 || Reedy Creek || J. Broughton || — || align=right | 1.5 km || 
|-id=798 bgcolor=#fefefe
| 276798 ||  || — || July 16, 2004 || Reedy Creek || J. Broughton || NYS || align=right data-sort-value="0.72" | 720 m || 
|-id=799 bgcolor=#E9E9E9
| 276799 ||  || — || July 21, 2004 || Reedy Creek || J. Broughton || — || align=right | 1.2 km || 
|-id=800 bgcolor=#fefefe
| 276800 ||  || — || July 28, 2004 || Bergisch Gladbac || W. Bickel || — || align=right data-sort-value="0.94" | 940 m || 
|}

276801–276900 

|-bgcolor=#E9E9E9
| 276801 ||  || — || August 5, 2004 || Palomar || NEAT || — || align=right | 3.5 km || 
|-id=802 bgcolor=#fefefe
| 276802 ||  || — || August 3, 2004 || Siding Spring || SSS || MAS || align=right data-sort-value="0.80" | 800 m || 
|-id=803 bgcolor=#fefefe
| 276803 ||  || — || August 6, 2004 || Campo Imperatore || CINEOS || MAS || align=right data-sort-value="0.99" | 990 m || 
|-id=804 bgcolor=#fefefe
| 276804 ||  || — || August 7, 2004 || Palomar || NEAT || — || align=right data-sort-value="0.98" | 980 m || 
|-id=805 bgcolor=#fefefe
| 276805 ||  || — || August 8, 2004 || Anderson Mesa || LONEOS || NYS || align=right data-sort-value="0.79" | 790 m || 
|-id=806 bgcolor=#E9E9E9
| 276806 ||  || — || August 8, 2004 || Anderson Mesa || LONEOS || — || align=right | 1.2 km || 
|-id=807 bgcolor=#E9E9E9
| 276807 ||  || — || August 8, 2004 || Palomar || NEAT || — || align=right | 1.9 km || 
|-id=808 bgcolor=#fefefe
| 276808 ||  || — || August 8, 2004 || Socorro || LINEAR || NYS || align=right | 1.0 km || 
|-id=809 bgcolor=#E9E9E9
| 276809 ||  || — || August 5, 2004 || Palomar || NEAT || DOR || align=right | 2.9 km || 
|-id=810 bgcolor=#fefefe
| 276810 ||  || — || August 7, 2004 || Palomar || NEAT || — || align=right | 1.1 km || 
|-id=811 bgcolor=#E9E9E9
| 276811 ||  || — || August 8, 2004 || Socorro || LINEAR || EUN || align=right | 1.4 km || 
|-id=812 bgcolor=#E9E9E9
| 276812 ||  || — || August 8, 2004 || Socorro || LINEAR || MIS || align=right | 2.9 km || 
|-id=813 bgcolor=#E9E9E9
| 276813 ||  || — || August 9, 2004 || Anderson Mesa || LONEOS || GEF || align=right | 2.0 km || 
|-id=814 bgcolor=#E9E9E9
| 276814 ||  || — || August 8, 2004 || Socorro || LINEAR || — || align=right | 1.2 km || 
|-id=815 bgcolor=#E9E9E9
| 276815 ||  || — || August 9, 2004 || Socorro || LINEAR || — || align=right | 1.2 km || 
|-id=816 bgcolor=#E9E9E9
| 276816 ||  || — || August 9, 2004 || Socorro || LINEAR || — || align=right | 1.2 km || 
|-id=817 bgcolor=#E9E9E9
| 276817 ||  || — || August 9, 2004 || Socorro || LINEAR || — || align=right | 1.8 km || 
|-id=818 bgcolor=#E9E9E9
| 276818 ||  || — || August 7, 2004 || Palomar || NEAT || — || align=right | 2.3 km || 
|-id=819 bgcolor=#fefefe
| 276819 ||  || — || August 9, 2004 || Socorro || LINEAR || PHO || align=right | 1.5 km || 
|-id=820 bgcolor=#fefefe
| 276820 ||  || — || August 10, 2004 || Socorro || LINEAR || MAS || align=right data-sort-value="0.96" | 960 m || 
|-id=821 bgcolor=#E9E9E9
| 276821 ||  || — || August 10, 2004 || Socorro || LINEAR || — || align=right | 1.6 km || 
|-id=822 bgcolor=#E9E9E9
| 276822 ||  || — || August 11, 2004 || Socorro || LINEAR || — || align=right | 2.1 km || 
|-id=823 bgcolor=#fefefe
| 276823 ||  || — || August 8, 2004 || Socorro || LINEAR || ERI || align=right | 2.0 km || 
|-id=824 bgcolor=#E9E9E9
| 276824 ||  || — || August 8, 2004 || Socorro || LINEAR || — || align=right | 3.2 km || 
|-id=825 bgcolor=#FA8072
| 276825 ||  || — || August 11, 2004 || Socorro || LINEAR || — || align=right | 1.1 km || 
|-id=826 bgcolor=#E9E9E9
| 276826 ||  || — || August 11, 2004 || Socorro || LINEAR || — || align=right | 2.4 km || 
|-id=827 bgcolor=#E9E9E9
| 276827 ||  || — || August 12, 2004 || Socorro || LINEAR || — || align=right | 2.2 km || 
|-id=828 bgcolor=#E9E9E9
| 276828 ||  || — || August 12, 2004 || Socorro || LINEAR || — || align=right | 2.1 km || 
|-id=829 bgcolor=#E9E9E9
| 276829 ||  || — || August 9, 2004 || Socorro || LINEAR || — || align=right | 1.8 km || 
|-id=830 bgcolor=#fefefe
| 276830 ||  || — || August 3, 2004 || Siding Spring || SSS || — || align=right data-sort-value="0.96" | 960 m || 
|-id=831 bgcolor=#fefefe
| 276831 ||  || — || August 20, 2004 || Kitt Peak || Spacewatch || EUT || align=right data-sort-value="0.80" | 800 m || 
|-id=832 bgcolor=#fefefe
| 276832 ||  || — || August 21, 2004 || Reedy Creek || J. Broughton || — || align=right | 1.2 km || 
|-id=833 bgcolor=#fefefe
| 276833 ||  || — || August 21, 2004 || Catalina || CSS || — || align=right | 1.0 km || 
|-id=834 bgcolor=#d6d6d6
| 276834 ||  || — || August 21, 2004 || Catalina || CSS || — || align=right | 3.3 km || 
|-id=835 bgcolor=#fefefe
| 276835 ||  || — || September 6, 2004 || Socorro || LINEAR || H || align=right | 1.0 km || 
|-id=836 bgcolor=#fefefe
| 276836 ||  || — || September 6, 2004 || Socorro || LINEAR || H || align=right | 1.0 km || 
|-id=837 bgcolor=#fefefe
| 276837 ||  || — || September 4, 2004 || Palomar || NEAT || — || align=right | 1.0 km || 
|-id=838 bgcolor=#E9E9E9
| 276838 ||  || — || September 6, 2004 || Needville || Needville Obs. || — || align=right | 1.9 km || 
|-id=839 bgcolor=#fefefe
| 276839 ||  || — || September 6, 2004 || Siding Spring || SSS || — || align=right | 1.1 km || 
|-id=840 bgcolor=#fefefe
| 276840 ||  || — || September 7, 2004 || Socorro || LINEAR || — || align=right | 1.4 km || 
|-id=841 bgcolor=#E9E9E9
| 276841 ||  || — || September 7, 2004 || Kitt Peak || Spacewatch || — || align=right | 2.3 km || 
|-id=842 bgcolor=#E9E9E9
| 276842 ||  || — || September 7, 2004 || Kitt Peak || Spacewatch || — || align=right | 2.9 km || 
|-id=843 bgcolor=#E9E9E9
| 276843 ||  || — || September 7, 2004 || Kitt Peak || Spacewatch || — || align=right | 1.1 km || 
|-id=844 bgcolor=#E9E9E9
| 276844 ||  || — || September 7, 2004 || Socorro || LINEAR || — || align=right | 3.4 km || 
|-id=845 bgcolor=#E9E9E9
| 276845 ||  || — || September 8, 2004 || Socorro || LINEAR || — || align=right | 1.7 km || 
|-id=846 bgcolor=#fefefe
| 276846 ||  || — || September 8, 2004 || Socorro || LINEAR || MAS || align=right | 1.0 km || 
|-id=847 bgcolor=#fefefe
| 276847 ||  || — || September 8, 2004 || Socorro || LINEAR || — || align=right | 1.5 km || 
|-id=848 bgcolor=#E9E9E9
| 276848 ||  || — || September 8, 2004 || Socorro || LINEAR || — || align=right | 3.0 km || 
|-id=849 bgcolor=#E9E9E9
| 276849 ||  || — || September 8, 2004 || Palomar || NEAT || — || align=right | 1.3 km || 
|-id=850 bgcolor=#d6d6d6
| 276850 ||  || — || September 8, 2004 || Palomar || NEAT || KOR || align=right | 1.6 km || 
|-id=851 bgcolor=#E9E9E9
| 276851 ||  || — || September 7, 2004 || Socorro || LINEAR || — || align=right | 2.0 km || 
|-id=852 bgcolor=#E9E9E9
| 276852 ||  || — || September 8, 2004 || Socorro || LINEAR || — || align=right | 1.2 km || 
|-id=853 bgcolor=#E9E9E9
| 276853 ||  || — || September 8, 2004 || Socorro || LINEAR || — || align=right | 1.6 km || 
|-id=854 bgcolor=#d6d6d6
| 276854 ||  || — || September 9, 2004 || Socorro || LINEAR || — || align=right | 3.5 km || 
|-id=855 bgcolor=#d6d6d6
| 276855 ||  || — || September 7, 2004 || Kitt Peak || Spacewatch || — || align=right | 2.8 km || 
|-id=856 bgcolor=#E9E9E9
| 276856 ||  || — || September 7, 2004 || Kitt Peak || Spacewatch || — || align=right | 2.0 km || 
|-id=857 bgcolor=#fefefe
| 276857 ||  || — || September 8, 2004 || Palomar || NEAT || — || align=right | 1.3 km || 
|-id=858 bgcolor=#E9E9E9
| 276858 ||  || — || September 9, 2004 || Socorro || LINEAR || — || align=right | 1.0 km || 
|-id=859 bgcolor=#E9E9E9
| 276859 ||  || — || September 9, 2004 || Socorro || LINEAR || XIZ || align=right | 1.5 km || 
|-id=860 bgcolor=#E9E9E9
| 276860 ||  || — || September 9, 2004 || Socorro || LINEAR || — || align=right | 3.4 km || 
|-id=861 bgcolor=#E9E9E9
| 276861 ||  || — || September 9, 2004 || Socorro || LINEAR || XIZ || align=right | 1.7 km || 
|-id=862 bgcolor=#d6d6d6
| 276862 ||  || — || September 10, 2004 || Socorro || LINEAR || — || align=right | 2.3 km || 
|-id=863 bgcolor=#E9E9E9
| 276863 ||  || — || September 10, 2004 || Socorro || LINEAR || MARcritical || align=right data-sort-value="0.88" | 880 m || 
|-id=864 bgcolor=#E9E9E9
| 276864 ||  || — || September 10, 2004 || Socorro || LINEAR || — || align=right | 2.8 km || 
|-id=865 bgcolor=#fefefe
| 276865 ||  || — || September 8, 2004 || Socorro || LINEAR || V || align=right | 1.0 km || 
|-id=866 bgcolor=#E9E9E9
| 276866 ||  || — || September 8, 2004 || Socorro || LINEAR || — || align=right | 1.3 km || 
|-id=867 bgcolor=#E9E9E9
| 276867 ||  || — || September 9, 2004 || Socorro || LINEAR || — || align=right | 2.4 km || 
|-id=868 bgcolor=#E9E9E9
| 276868 ||  || — || September 10, 2004 || Socorro || LINEAR || KRM || align=right | 2.7 km || 
|-id=869 bgcolor=#E9E9E9
| 276869 ||  || — || September 10, 2004 || Socorro || LINEAR || — || align=right | 2.5 km || 
|-id=870 bgcolor=#E9E9E9
| 276870 ||  || — || September 10, 2004 || Socorro || LINEAR || MAR || align=right | 1.4 km || 
|-id=871 bgcolor=#E9E9E9
| 276871 ||  || — || September 10, 2004 || Kitt Peak || Spacewatch || — || align=right data-sort-value="0.86" | 860 m || 
|-id=872 bgcolor=#fefefe
| 276872 ||  || — || September 11, 2004 || Socorro || LINEAR || — || align=right | 1.1 km || 
|-id=873 bgcolor=#d6d6d6
| 276873 ||  || — || September 14, 2004 || Socorro || LINEAR || Tj (2.91) || align=right | 4.5 km || 
|-id=874 bgcolor=#E9E9E9
| 276874 ||  || — || September 9, 2004 || Kitt Peak || Spacewatch || — || align=right | 1.1 km || 
|-id=875 bgcolor=#fefefe
| 276875 ||  || — || September 10, 2004 || Kitt Peak || Spacewatch || NYS || align=right data-sort-value="0.96" | 960 m || 
|-id=876 bgcolor=#E9E9E9
| 276876 ||  || — || September 10, 2004 || Kitt Peak || Spacewatch || WIT || align=right | 1.0 km || 
|-id=877 bgcolor=#E9E9E9
| 276877 ||  || — || September 10, 2004 || Kitt Peak || Spacewatch || AGN || align=right | 1.2 km || 
|-id=878 bgcolor=#E9E9E9
| 276878 ||  || — || September 10, 2004 || Kitt Peak || Spacewatch || AGN || align=right | 1.2 km || 
|-id=879 bgcolor=#E9E9E9
| 276879 ||  || — || September 10, 2004 || Kitt Peak || Spacewatch || — || align=right | 2.5 km || 
|-id=880 bgcolor=#fefefe
| 276880 ||  || — || September 15, 2004 || Socorro || LINEAR || H || align=right | 1.2 km || 
|-id=881 bgcolor=#E9E9E9
| 276881 ||  || — || September 6, 2004 || Palomar || NEAT || — || align=right | 2.2 km || 
|-id=882 bgcolor=#E9E9E9
| 276882 ||  || — || September 11, 2004 || Kitt Peak || Spacewatch || — || align=right | 1.1 km || 
|-id=883 bgcolor=#E9E9E9
| 276883 ||  || — || September 13, 2004 || Socorro || LINEAR || — || align=right | 3.3 km || 
|-id=884 bgcolor=#E9E9E9
| 276884 ||  || — || September 15, 2004 || Kitt Peak || Spacewatch || — || align=right | 1.5 km || 
|-id=885 bgcolor=#E9E9E9
| 276885 ||  || — || September 12, 2004 || Socorro || LINEAR || JUN || align=right | 1.6 km || 
|-id=886 bgcolor=#E9E9E9
| 276886 ||  || — || September 13, 2004 || Socorro || LINEAR || — || align=right | 1.8 km || 
|-id=887 bgcolor=#E9E9E9
| 276887 ||  || — || September 15, 2004 || Kitt Peak || Spacewatch || EUN || align=right | 1.5 km || 
|-id=888 bgcolor=#FA8072
| 276888 ||  || — || September 13, 2004 || Socorro || LINEAR || — || align=right | 1.0 km || 
|-id=889 bgcolor=#E9E9E9
| 276889 ||  || — || September 15, 2004 || Anderson Mesa || LONEOS || RAF || align=right | 1.0 km || 
|-id=890 bgcolor=#E9E9E9
| 276890 ||  || — || September 15, 2004 || Anderson Mesa || LONEOS || — || align=right | 1.1 km || 
|-id=891 bgcolor=#FFC2E0
| 276891 ||  || — || September 15, 2004 || Mauna Kea || D. J. Tholen || APO || align=right data-sort-value="0.44" | 440 m || 
|-id=892 bgcolor=#d6d6d6
| 276892 ||  || — || September 11, 2004 || Socorro || LINEAR || TIR || align=right | 3.8 km || 
|-id=893 bgcolor=#E9E9E9
| 276893 ||  || — || September 14, 2004 || Palomar || NEAT || — || align=right | 2.3 km || 
|-id=894 bgcolor=#E9E9E9
| 276894 ||  || — || September 7, 2004 || Socorro || LINEAR || — || align=right | 1.5 km || 
|-id=895 bgcolor=#fefefe
| 276895 ||  || — || September 8, 2004 || Socorro || LINEAR || MAS || align=right data-sort-value="0.97" | 970 m || 
|-id=896 bgcolor=#E9E9E9
| 276896 ||  || — || September 13, 2004 || Socorro || LINEAR || — || align=right | 1.8 km || 
|-id=897 bgcolor=#fefefe
| 276897 ||  || — || September 11, 2004 || Kitt Peak || Spacewatch || MAS || align=right data-sort-value="0.82" | 820 m || 
|-id=898 bgcolor=#d6d6d6
| 276898 ||  || — || September 15, 2004 || Kitt Peak || Spacewatch || — || align=right | 2.2 km || 
|-id=899 bgcolor=#E9E9E9
| 276899 ||  || — || September 17, 2004 || Kitt Peak || Spacewatch || — || align=right | 2.2 km || 
|-id=900 bgcolor=#d6d6d6
| 276900 ||  || — || September 17, 2004 || Kitt Peak || Spacewatch || URS || align=right | 5.8 km || 
|}

276901–277000 

|-bgcolor=#fefefe
| 276901 ||  || — || September 16, 2004 || Siding Spring || SSS || — || align=right data-sort-value="0.86" | 860 m || 
|-id=902 bgcolor=#E9E9E9
| 276902 ||  || — || September 16, 2004 || Siding Spring || SSS || — || align=right | 1.6 km || 
|-id=903 bgcolor=#E9E9E9
| 276903 ||  || — || September 22, 2004 || Three Buttes || Three Buttes Obs. || — || align=right | 1.8 km || 
|-id=904 bgcolor=#fefefe
| 276904 ||  || — || September 16, 2004 || Kitt Peak || Spacewatch || — || align=right data-sort-value="0.82" | 820 m || 
|-id=905 bgcolor=#E9E9E9
| 276905 ||  || — || September 17, 2004 || Socorro || LINEAR || EUN || align=right | 1.5 km || 
|-id=906 bgcolor=#d6d6d6
| 276906 ||  || — || September 17, 2004 || Kitt Peak || Spacewatch || — || align=right | 3.9 km || 
|-id=907 bgcolor=#E9E9E9
| 276907 ||  || — || September 17, 2004 || Kitt Peak || Spacewatch || — || align=right | 2.9 km || 
|-id=908 bgcolor=#d6d6d6
| 276908 ||  || — || September 24, 2004 || Socorro || LINEAR || — || align=right | 5.8 km || 
|-id=909 bgcolor=#E9E9E9
| 276909 ||  || — || October 4, 2004 || Kitt Peak || Spacewatch || — || align=right | 2.2 km || 
|-id=910 bgcolor=#fefefe
| 276910 ||  || — || October 7, 2004 || Kitt Peak || Spacewatch || H || align=right data-sort-value="0.54" | 540 m || 
|-id=911 bgcolor=#fefefe
| 276911 ||  || — || October 8, 2004 || Socorro || LINEAR || H || align=right data-sort-value="0.66" | 660 m || 
|-id=912 bgcolor=#E9E9E9
| 276912 ||  || — || October 7, 2004 || Goodricke-Pigott || R. A. Tucker || — || align=right | 1.1 km || 
|-id=913 bgcolor=#E9E9E9
| 276913 ||  || — || October 4, 2004 || Kitt Peak || Spacewatch || — || align=right | 3.6 km || 
|-id=914 bgcolor=#E9E9E9
| 276914 ||  || — || October 4, 2004 || Kitt Peak || Spacewatch || — || align=right | 2.3 km || 
|-id=915 bgcolor=#E9E9E9
| 276915 ||  || — || October 4, 2004 || Kitt Peak || Spacewatch || — || align=right | 2.0 km || 
|-id=916 bgcolor=#E9E9E9
| 276916 ||  || — || October 4, 2004 || Kitt Peak || Spacewatch || MRX || align=right | 1.5 km || 
|-id=917 bgcolor=#E9E9E9
| 276917 ||  || — || October 5, 2004 || Kitt Peak || Spacewatch || — || align=right | 2.0 km || 
|-id=918 bgcolor=#E9E9E9
| 276918 ||  || — || October 6, 2004 || Kitt Peak || Spacewatch || — || align=right | 1.8 km || 
|-id=919 bgcolor=#E9E9E9
| 276919 ||  || — || October 5, 2004 || Kitt Peak || Spacewatch || — || align=right | 1.2 km || 
|-id=920 bgcolor=#E9E9E9
| 276920 ||  || — || October 5, 2004 || Kitt Peak || Spacewatch || — || align=right | 1.0 km || 
|-id=921 bgcolor=#E9E9E9
| 276921 ||  || — || October 5, 2004 || Kitt Peak || Spacewatch || — || align=right | 1.1 km || 
|-id=922 bgcolor=#E9E9E9
| 276922 ||  || — || October 7, 2004 || Socorro || LINEAR || HNA || align=right | 3.0 km || 
|-id=923 bgcolor=#E9E9E9
| 276923 ||  || — || October 7, 2004 || Kitt Peak || Spacewatch || — || align=right | 2.2 km || 
|-id=924 bgcolor=#d6d6d6
| 276924 ||  || — || October 7, 2004 || Socorro || LINEAR || — || align=right | 3.7 km || 
|-id=925 bgcolor=#E9E9E9
| 276925 ||  || — || October 7, 2004 || Anderson Mesa || LONEOS || EUN || align=right | 2.1 km || 
|-id=926 bgcolor=#E9E9E9
| 276926 ||  || — || October 7, 2004 || Anderson Mesa || LONEOS || — || align=right | 2.3 km || 
|-id=927 bgcolor=#E9E9E9
| 276927 ||  || — || October 9, 2004 || Anderson Mesa || LONEOS || — || align=right | 2.6 km || 
|-id=928 bgcolor=#E9E9E9
| 276928 ||  || — || October 4, 2004 || Kitt Peak || Spacewatch || — || align=right | 1.4 km || 
|-id=929 bgcolor=#E9E9E9
| 276929 ||  || — || October 5, 2004 || Kitt Peak || Spacewatch || — || align=right | 1.7 km || 
|-id=930 bgcolor=#E9E9E9
| 276930 ||  || — || October 6, 2004 || Kitt Peak || Spacewatch || KON || align=right | 3.0 km || 
|-id=931 bgcolor=#E9E9E9
| 276931 ||  || — || October 6, 2004 || Kitt Peak || Spacewatch || — || align=right | 1.5 km || 
|-id=932 bgcolor=#E9E9E9
| 276932 ||  || — || October 6, 2004 || Kitt Peak || Spacewatch || — || align=right | 1.8 km || 
|-id=933 bgcolor=#fefefe
| 276933 ||  || — || October 4, 2004 || Kitt Peak || Spacewatch || NYS || align=right data-sort-value="0.72" | 720 m || 
|-id=934 bgcolor=#E9E9E9
| 276934 ||  || — || October 7, 2004 || Kitt Peak || Spacewatch || — || align=right | 3.5 km || 
|-id=935 bgcolor=#E9E9E9
| 276935 ||  || — || October 7, 2004 || Kitt Peak || Spacewatch || — || align=right | 2.6 km || 
|-id=936 bgcolor=#E9E9E9
| 276936 ||  || — || October 7, 2004 || Kitt Peak || Spacewatch || — || align=right | 2.1 km || 
|-id=937 bgcolor=#E9E9E9
| 276937 ||  || — || October 8, 2004 || Kitt Peak || Spacewatch || — || align=right | 2.2 km || 
|-id=938 bgcolor=#E9E9E9
| 276938 ||  || — || October 8, 2004 || Kitt Peak || Spacewatch || — || align=right | 1.4 km || 
|-id=939 bgcolor=#E9E9E9
| 276939 ||  || — || October 9, 2004 || Kitt Peak || Spacewatch || — || align=right | 2.8 km || 
|-id=940 bgcolor=#E9E9E9
| 276940 ||  || — || October 8, 2004 || Kitt Peak || Spacewatch || HEN || align=right data-sort-value="0.98" | 980 m || 
|-id=941 bgcolor=#E9E9E9
| 276941 ||  || — || October 8, 2004 || Anderson Mesa || LONEOS || NEM || align=right | 3.0 km || 
|-id=942 bgcolor=#E9E9E9
| 276942 ||  || — || October 9, 2004 || Kitt Peak || Spacewatch || — || align=right | 1.7 km || 
|-id=943 bgcolor=#E9E9E9
| 276943 ||  || — || October 10, 2004 || Socorro || LINEAR || — || align=right | 2.5 km || 
|-id=944 bgcolor=#d6d6d6
| 276944 ||  || — || October 9, 2004 || Kitt Peak || Spacewatch || 7:4 || align=right | 3.4 km || 
|-id=945 bgcolor=#E9E9E9
| 276945 ||  || — || October 9, 2004 || Kitt Peak || Spacewatch || — || align=right | 1.8 km || 
|-id=946 bgcolor=#E9E9E9
| 276946 ||  || — || October 9, 2004 || Kitt Peak || Spacewatch || — || align=right | 1.7 km || 
|-id=947 bgcolor=#E9E9E9
| 276947 ||  || — || October 9, 2004 || Kitt Peak || Spacewatch || — || align=right | 2.5 km || 
|-id=948 bgcolor=#E9E9E9
| 276948 ||  || — || October 10, 2004 || Socorro || LINEAR || — || align=right | 3.5 km || 
|-id=949 bgcolor=#fefefe
| 276949 ||  || — || October 8, 2004 || Kitt Peak || Spacewatch || — || align=right | 1.1 km || 
|-id=950 bgcolor=#E9E9E9
| 276950 ||  || — || October 8, 2004 || Kitt Peak || Spacewatch || — || align=right | 1.0 km || 
|-id=951 bgcolor=#E9E9E9
| 276951 ||  || — || October 8, 2004 || Kitt Peak || Spacewatch || — || align=right | 1.5 km || 
|-id=952 bgcolor=#E9E9E9
| 276952 ||  || — || October 9, 2004 || Socorro || LINEAR || — || align=right | 2.5 km || 
|-id=953 bgcolor=#E9E9E9
| 276953 ||  || — || October 10, 2004 || Kitt Peak || Spacewatch || MRX || align=right | 1.4 km || 
|-id=954 bgcolor=#E9E9E9
| 276954 ||  || — || October 11, 2004 || Kitt Peak || Spacewatch || GEF || align=right | 1.7 km || 
|-id=955 bgcolor=#E9E9E9
| 276955 ||  || — || October 8, 2004 || Kitt Peak || Spacewatch || — || align=right | 1.8 km || 
|-id=956 bgcolor=#E9E9E9
| 276956 ||  || — || October 11, 2004 || Kitt Peak || Spacewatch || PAD || align=right | 1.6 km || 
|-id=957 bgcolor=#E9E9E9
| 276957 ||  || — || October 4, 2004 || Palomar || NEAT || — || align=right | 1.5 km || 
|-id=958 bgcolor=#E9E9E9
| 276958 ||  || — || October 4, 2004 || Palomar || NEAT || — || align=right | 3.7 km || 
|-id=959 bgcolor=#E9E9E9
| 276959 ||  || — || October 8, 2004 || Kitt Peak || Spacewatch || — || align=right data-sort-value="0.95" | 950 m || 
|-id=960 bgcolor=#E9E9E9
| 276960 ||  || — || October 13, 2004 || Kitt Peak || Spacewatch || — || align=right | 3.0 km || 
|-id=961 bgcolor=#E9E9E9
| 276961 ||  || — || October 13, 2004 || Kitt Peak || Spacewatch || AEO || align=right | 1.6 km || 
|-id=962 bgcolor=#E9E9E9
| 276962 ||  || — || October 14, 2004 || Socorro || LINEAR || BRU || align=right | 3.5 km || 
|-id=963 bgcolor=#d6d6d6
| 276963 ||  || — || October 11, 2004 || Kitt Peak || Spacewatch || KOR || align=right | 1.3 km || 
|-id=964 bgcolor=#E9E9E9
| 276964 ||  || — || October 11, 2004 || Kitt Peak || Spacewatch || — || align=right | 3.2 km || 
|-id=965 bgcolor=#E9E9E9
| 276965 ||  || — || October 18, 2004 || Socorro || LINEAR || — || align=right | 2.1 km || 
|-id=966 bgcolor=#E9E9E9
| 276966 ||  || — || October 18, 2004 || Socorro || LINEAR || ADE || align=right | 2.2 km || 
|-id=967 bgcolor=#d6d6d6
| 276967 ||  || — || October 16, 2004 || Socorro || LINEAR || TIR || align=right | 3.4 km || 
|-id=968 bgcolor=#E9E9E9
| 276968 ||  || — || October 19, 2004 || Socorro || LINEAR || — || align=right | 2.6 km || 
|-id=969 bgcolor=#E9E9E9
| 276969 ||  || — || November 4, 2004 || Anderson Mesa || LONEOS || MAR || align=right | 1.8 km || 
|-id=970 bgcolor=#E9E9E9
| 276970 ||  || — || November 4, 2004 || Catalina || CSS || — || align=right | 1.5 km || 
|-id=971 bgcolor=#E9E9E9
| 276971 ||  || — || November 4, 2004 || Catalina || CSS || EUN || align=right | 1.6 km || 
|-id=972 bgcolor=#E9E9E9
| 276972 ||  || — || November 3, 2004 || Kitt Peak || Spacewatch || — || align=right | 1.7 km || 
|-id=973 bgcolor=#E9E9E9
| 276973 ||  || — || November 4, 2004 || Kitt Peak || Spacewatch || — || align=right | 1.3 km || 
|-id=974 bgcolor=#E9E9E9
| 276974 ||  || — || November 7, 2004 || Socorro || LINEAR || — || align=right | 3.7 km || 
|-id=975 bgcolor=#E9E9E9
| 276975 Heller ||  ||  || November 11, 2004 || Piszkéstető || K. Sárneczky || — || align=right | 2.8 km || 
|-id=976 bgcolor=#E9E9E9
| 276976 ||  || — || November 4, 2004 || Catalina || CSS || AEO || align=right | 1.5 km || 
|-id=977 bgcolor=#E9E9E9
| 276977 ||  || — || November 12, 2004 || Catalina || CSS || — || align=right | 1.9 km || 
|-id=978 bgcolor=#E9E9E9
| 276978 ||  || — || November 12, 2004 || Catalina || CSS || — || align=right | 2.4 km || 
|-id=979 bgcolor=#E9E9E9
| 276979 ||  || — || November 11, 2004 || Kitt Peak || Spacewatch || — || align=right | 4.2 km || 
|-id=980 bgcolor=#d6d6d6
| 276980 ||  || — || November 10, 2004 || Kitt Peak || M. W. Buie || — || align=right | 2.2 km || 
|-id=981 bgcolor=#E9E9E9
| 276981 ||  || — || November 17, 2004 || Siding Spring || SSS || — || align=right | 3.4 km || 
|-id=982 bgcolor=#E9E9E9
| 276982 ||  || — || November 17, 2004 || Campo Imperatore || CINEOS || — || align=right | 2.2 km || 
|-id=983 bgcolor=#E9E9E9
| 276983 ||  || — || November 19, 2004 || Socorro || LINEAR || — || align=right | 3.1 km || 
|-id=984 bgcolor=#E9E9E9
| 276984 ||  || — || November 20, 2004 || Kitt Peak || Spacewatch || — || align=right | 2.6 km || 
|-id=985 bgcolor=#d6d6d6
| 276985 ||  || — || December 8, 2004 || Socorro || LINEAR || ALA || align=right | 5.6 km || 
|-id=986 bgcolor=#E9E9E9
| 276986 ||  || — || December 8, 2004 || Socorro || LINEAR || — || align=right | 3.7 km || 
|-id=987 bgcolor=#d6d6d6
| 276987 ||  || — || December 9, 2004 || Kitt Peak || Spacewatch || — || align=right | 4.0 km || 
|-id=988 bgcolor=#E9E9E9
| 276988 ||  || — || December 10, 2004 || Kitt Peak || Spacewatch || — || align=right | 1.4 km || 
|-id=989 bgcolor=#E9E9E9
| 276989 ||  || — || December 10, 2004 || Socorro || LINEAR || — || align=right | 3.8 km || 
|-id=990 bgcolor=#E9E9E9
| 276990 ||  || — || December 10, 2004 || Campo Imperatore || CINEOS || NEM || align=right | 2.9 km || 
|-id=991 bgcolor=#E9E9E9
| 276991 ||  || — || December 10, 2004 || Socorro || LINEAR || — || align=right | 4.0 km || 
|-id=992 bgcolor=#d6d6d6
| 276992 ||  || — || December 7, 2004 || Socorro || LINEAR || — || align=right | 4.7 km || 
|-id=993 bgcolor=#E9E9E9
| 276993 ||  || — || December 11, 2004 || Socorro || LINEAR || WIT || align=right | 1.7 km || 
|-id=994 bgcolor=#E9E9E9
| 276994 ||  || — || December 10, 2004 || Socorro || LINEAR || KON || align=right | 3.5 km || 
|-id=995 bgcolor=#d6d6d6
| 276995 ||  || — || December 9, 2004 || Kitt Peak || Spacewatch || KOR || align=right | 1.8 km || 
|-id=996 bgcolor=#E9E9E9
| 276996 ||  || — || December 9, 2004 || Kitt Peak || Spacewatch || — || align=right | 4.3 km || 
|-id=997 bgcolor=#E9E9E9
| 276997 ||  || — || December 14, 2004 || Campo Imperatore || CINEOS || — || align=right | 2.7 km || 
|-id=998 bgcolor=#E9E9E9
| 276998 ||  || — || December 13, 2004 || Socorro || LINEAR || — || align=right | 4.7 km || 
|-id=999 bgcolor=#E9E9E9
| 276999 ||  || — || December 10, 2004 || Socorro || LINEAR || — || align=right | 1.8 km || 
|-id=000 bgcolor=#E9E9E9
| 277000 ||  || — || December 14, 2004 || Kitt Peak || Spacewatch || HOF || align=right | 2.9 km || 
|}

References

External links 
 Discovery Circumstances: Numbered Minor Planets (275001)–(280000) (IAU Minor Planet Center)

0276